= Zhytomyr =

City and administrative center of Zhytomyr Oblast, Ukraine

Zhytomyr Житомир
- City
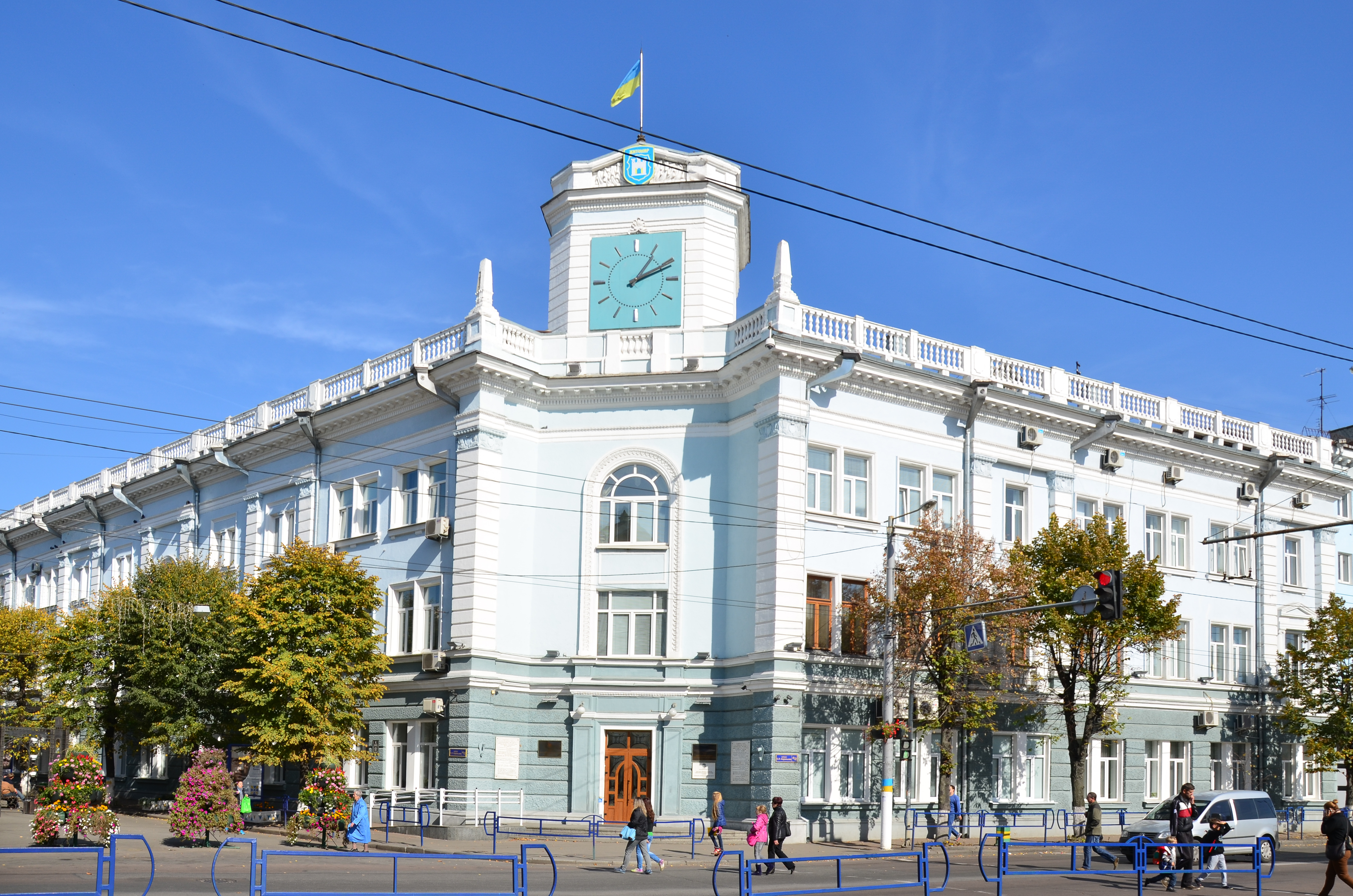
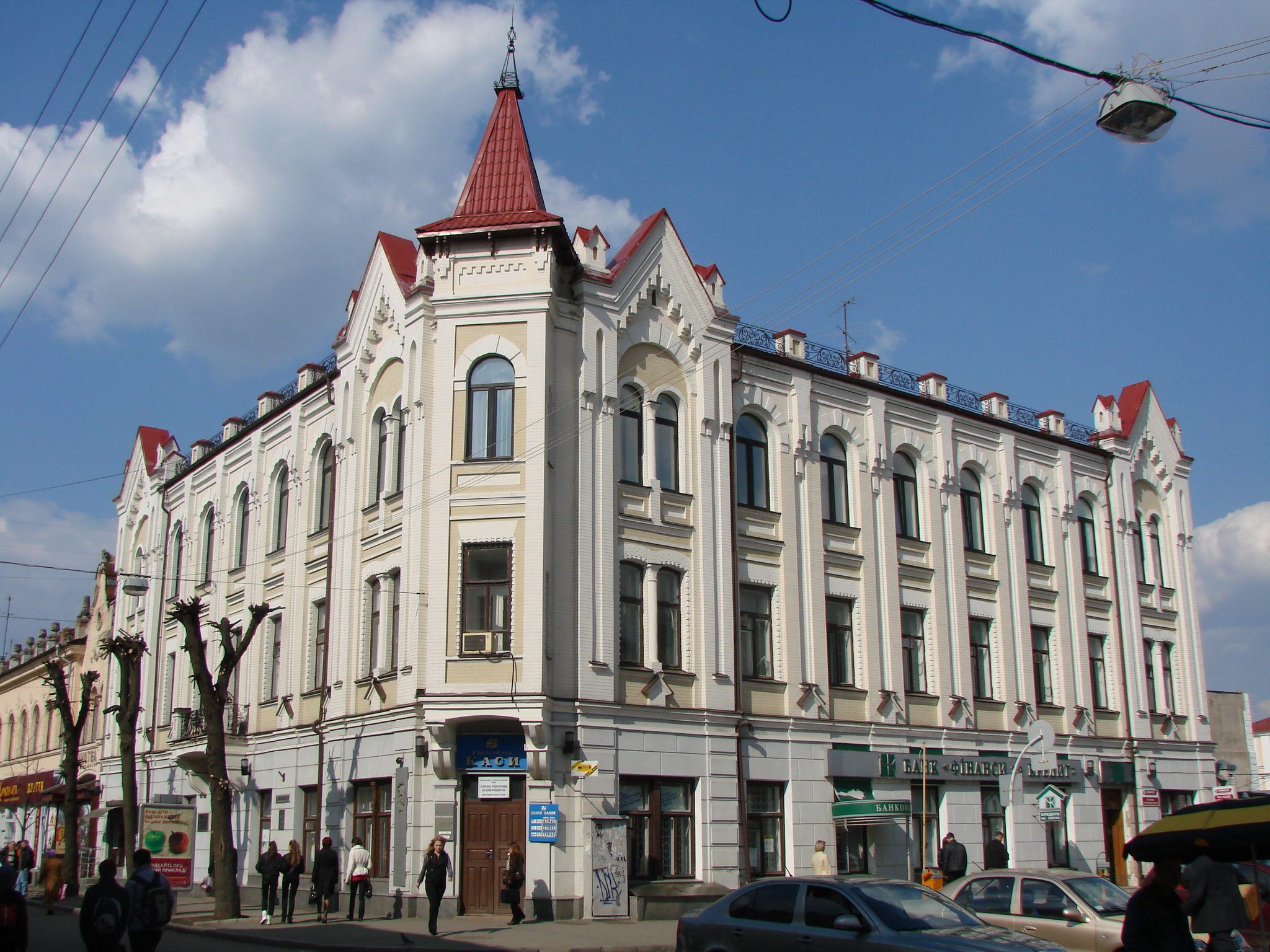
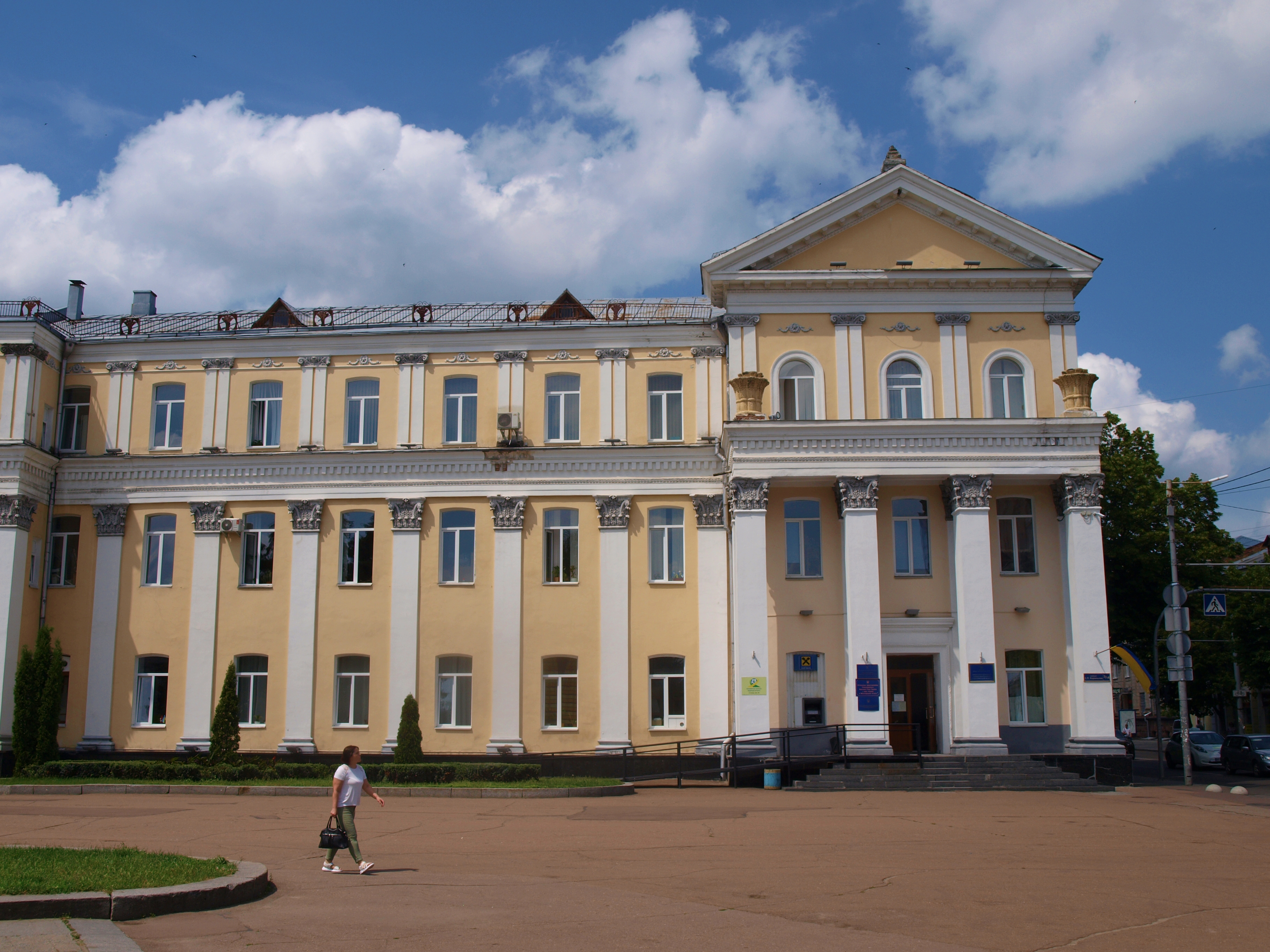
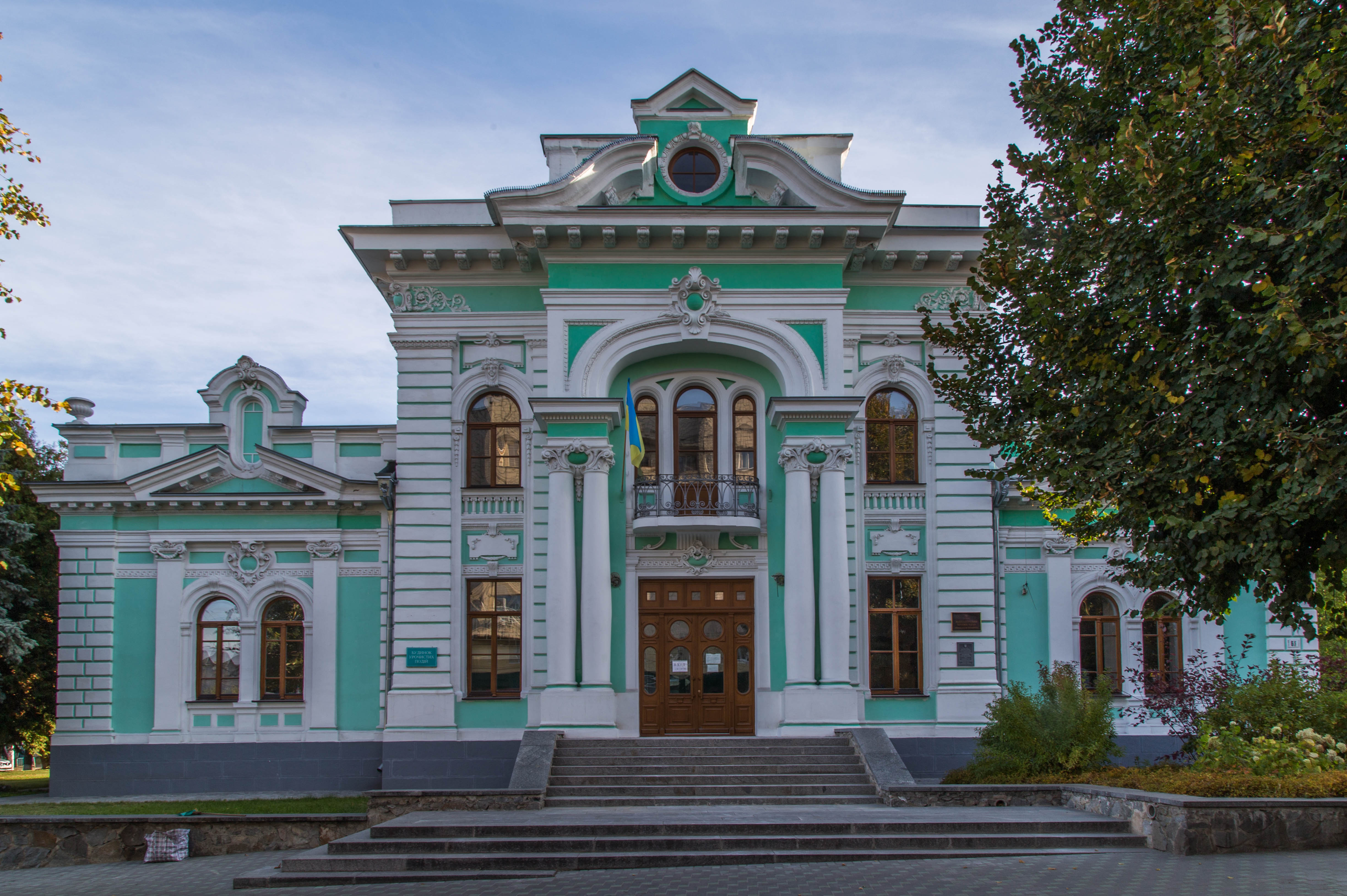
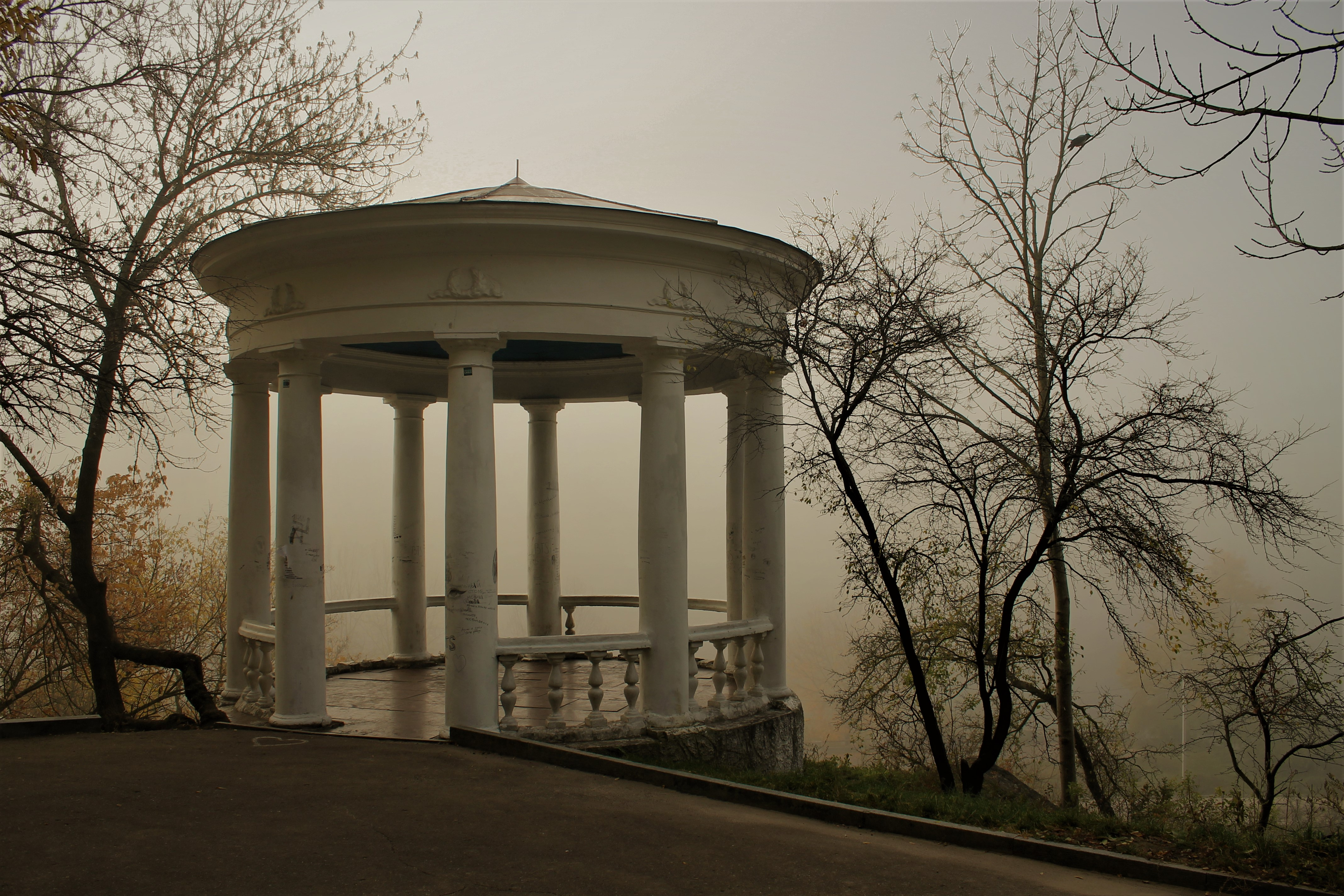
- City Hall House of Triebel Revenue House Filipov Manor Chaudoir Park

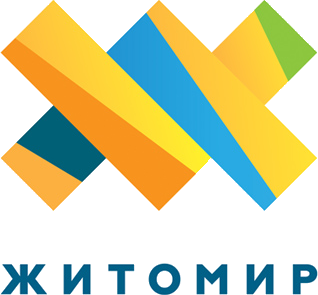
- Flag Coat of arms Brandmark

- Location within Zhytomyr Oblast Location within Ukraine
- Coordinates: 50°15′0″N 28°40′0″E
- Country: Ukraine
- Oblast: Zhytomyr Oblast
- Raion: Zhytomyr Raion
- Hromada: Zhytomyr urban hromada
- Founded: AD 884

Government
  - Mayor: Halyna Shymanska (secretary of City Council) (Independent)

Area
  - Total: 61 km^{2} (24 sq mi)
- Elevation: 221 m (725 ft)

Population (2022)
  - Total: 261,624
  - Density: 4,300/km^{2} (11,000/sq mi)
- Time zones: UTC+2 (winter)
- UTC+3 (summer DST)
- Postal code: 10000 — 10036
- Area code: +380 412
- Website: Zhytomyr

Zhytomyr (Ukrainian: Житомир [ʒɪˈtɔmɪr]; see below for other names) is a city in the north of the western half of Ukraine. It is the administrative center of Zhytomyr Oblast (province), as well as the administrative center of the surrounding Zhytomyr urban hromada (commune) and Zhytomyr Raion (district). Moreover, Zhytomyr consists of two urban districts: Bohunskyi District and Koroliovskyi District (named in honour of Sergey Korolyov). Zhytomyr occupies an area of 65 square kilometers (25 sq mi). Its population is 261,624 (2022 estimate).

Zhytomyr is a major Ukrainian transport hub as the city lies on a historic route linking the city of Kyiv with the west through Brest. Today it links Warsaw with Kyiv, Minsk with Izmail, and several major cities of Ukraine. Zhytomyr was also the location of Ozerne airbase, a key Cold War strategic aircraft base 11 kilometers (6.8 mi) southeast of the city.

Important economic activities of Zhytomyr include lumber milling, food processing, granite quarrying, metalworking, and the manufacture of musical instruments.

Zhytomyr Oblast is the main center of the Polish minority in Ukraine, and in the city itself there is a Latin Catholic cathedral and large Roman Catholic Polish cemetery, founded in 1800. It is regarded as the third biggest Polish cemetery outside Poland, after the Lychakivskiy Cemetery in Lviv and Rasos Cemetery in Vilnius.

== Names ==
The city of Zhytomyr is also historically known by different names in other languages:

- Russian: Житомир, romanized: Zhitomir [ʐɨˈtomʲɪr];
- Polish: Żytomierz [ʐɨˈtɔ.mjɛʂ];
- Belarusian: Жытомір, romanized: Žytomir [ʐɨˈtɔmʲir];
- Yiddish: זשיטאָמיר, romanized: Zhitomir [ʒɪˈtɔmɪr].
- French. Jytomyr. According to legend, the town was founded in 884 by Prince Jytomyr, a Slavic tribal leader.

== History ==
=== Early history ===
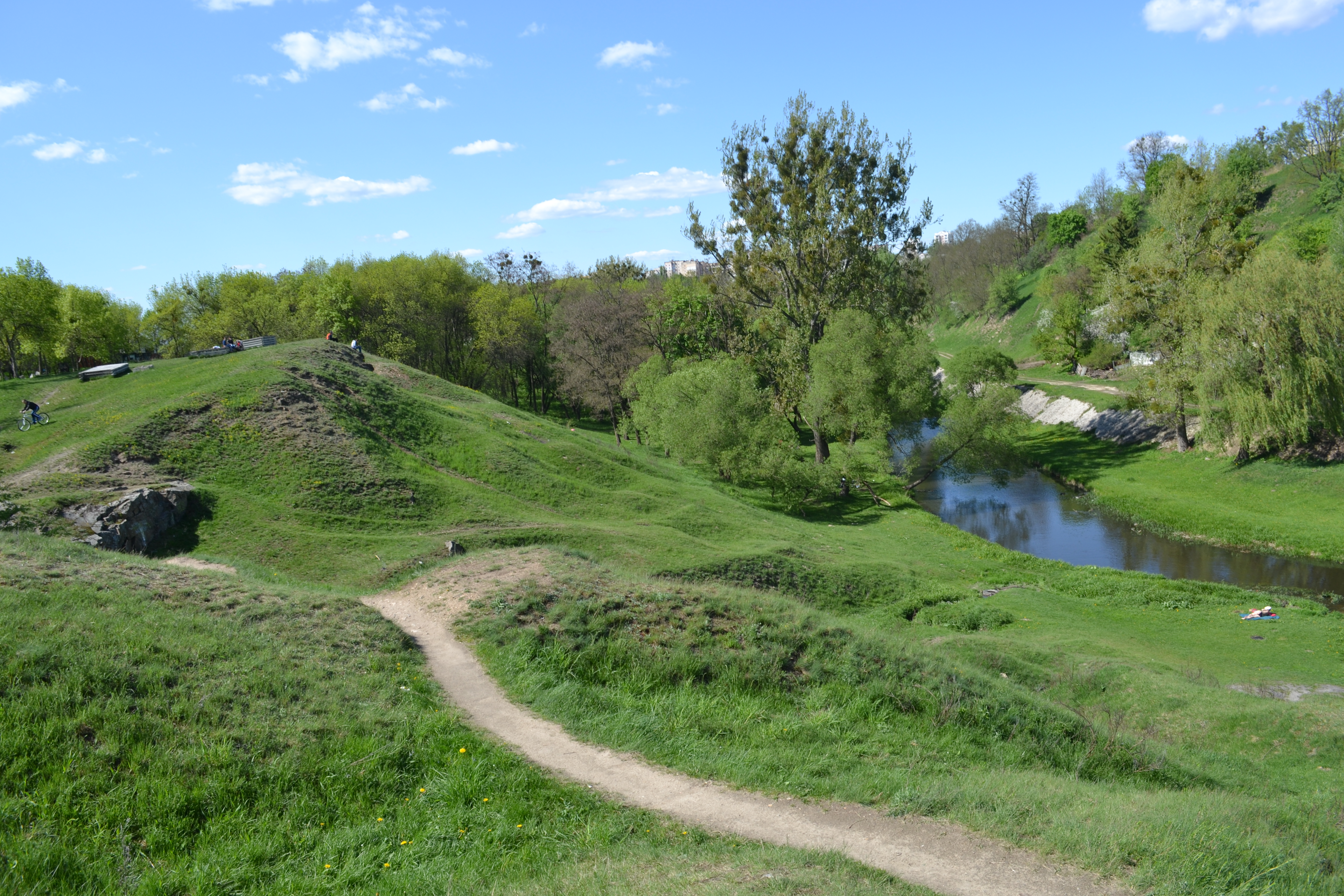
Medieval kurgans

Legend holds that Zhytomyr was established about 884 by Zhytomyr, prince of a Slavic tribe of Drevlians. This date, 884, is cut into a large stone of the ice age times, standing on the hill where Zhytomyr was founded. Zhytomyr was one of the prominent cities of Kievan Rus'. The first records of the town date from 1240, when it was sacked by the Mongol hordes of Batu Khan.

In 1320 Zhytomyr was captured by the Grand Duchy of Lithuania. It was granted Magdeburg city rights in 1444 by Casimir IV Jagiellon. As a border outpost, during the 15th century the city was seriously damaged by Tatar raids. After the Union of Lublin (1569) the city was incorporated into the Kingdom of Poland and became an important center of local administration, seat of the starosta, and capital of Żytomierz County. Here, sejmiks of Kiev Voivodeship took place. In 1572, the town had 142 buildings, a manor house of the starosta and a castle. Following the privilege of King Sigismund III Vasa, Zhytomyr had the right for two fairs a year. During Khmelnytsky Uprising (1648) Zhytomyr was destroyed by Cossack troops. As a result of the revolt, it was incorporated into the Cossack Hetmanate. In 1667, following the Treaty of Andrusovo, Zhytomyr became the capital of the Kiev Voivodeship. It was a royal city of Poland.

During the 18th century Zhytomyr became an important centre of Polish culture, serving as a centre of a Roman Catholic bishopric. In 1724, a Jesuit school and monastery were opened here. By 1765, Zhytomyr had five churches, including 3 Roman Catholic and 2 Orthodox, and 285 houses. Bernardine monks were also active in the city. After the Second Partition of Poland in 1793 it passed to Imperial Russia and became the capital of the Volhynian Governorate. In 1804 Zhytomyr was named capital of the Volhynian Governorate. In 1808, a Polish theater was founded in the city. In 1837 the city was deprived of its self-government according to Magdeburg Law. The Polish January Uprising of 1863 was supported by the townspeople.

=== Early 20th century ===
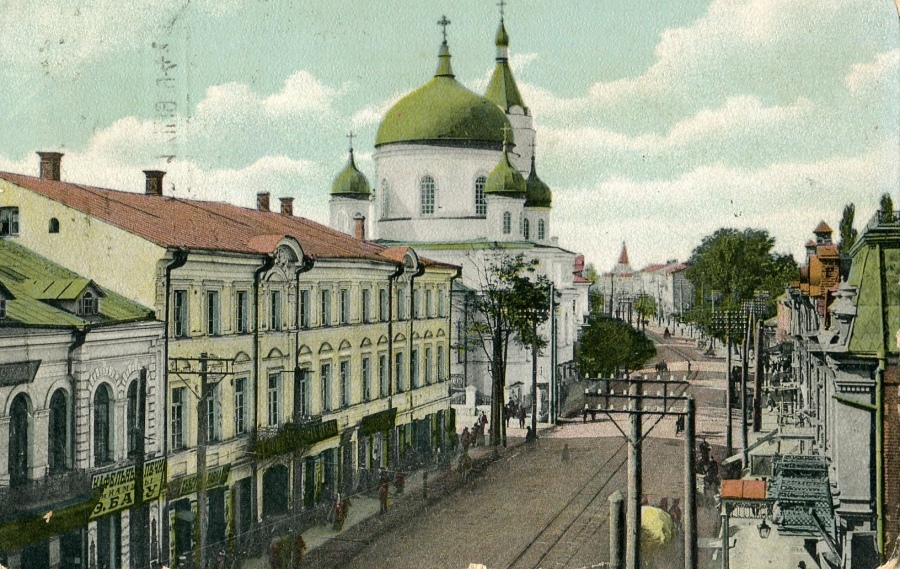
Kyivska street looking West toward St. Michael's Cathedral. Photo early 1900s.

After the February Revolution of 1917, the city duma of Zhytomyr supported the Provisional Government and opposed the Kornilov coup. On 8 November the duma condemned the October coup, and on 28 November recognized Central Rada as the only legal authority in Ukraine.

In January 1918 the Bolsheviks attempted to capture power in Zhytomyr, but were defeated. During a period of Ukrainian independence, between late January and early March 1918, the city served as the national capital of Ukrainian People's Republic. During that period, laws on the introduction of the national currency, hryvnia, on Ukrainian citizenship and on the administrative-territorial divisions of Ukraine were adopted in the city. On 6 March 1918, the city became the seat of Bolokhiv land, a newly established zemlia of the Ukrainian People's Republic, which was disbanded on 29 April 1918 by Hetman of Ukraine Pavlo Skoropadsky, who brought back old governorate divisions of the Russian Empire.

Between December 1918 and 1920 Zhytomyr was contested between Ukrainian and Bolshevik troops, as well as other powers, changing hands over 15 times. In August 1919 a battle between forces of Ukrainian Galician Army and the Bolsheviks took place in the city.

=== Soviet rule before WWII ===
On 12 June 1920 Zhytomyr occupied by Red Army troops of Grigory Kotovsky. As a result, for the following 70 years the city was a part of the Ukrainian Soviet Socialist Republic. It was the capital of the Volhynia Governorate.

Due to one of Stalin's 5-year plans, the city suffered from the man-made famine Holodomor of 1932-1933. In 2008, the National Museum of the Holodomor Genocide published the National Book of Memory of the Victims of the Holodomor of 1932–1933 in Ukraine. Zhytomyr region – Zhytomyr. The book has 1116 pages and consists of three sections. According to historical records, more than 8015 people died during Holodomor in 1932–1933.

In 1936, part of the Polish population was expelled by the Soviets to Kazakhstan. During the Polish Operation of the NKVD, the local Polish population was persecuted with mass deportations and executions.

=== During WWII ===
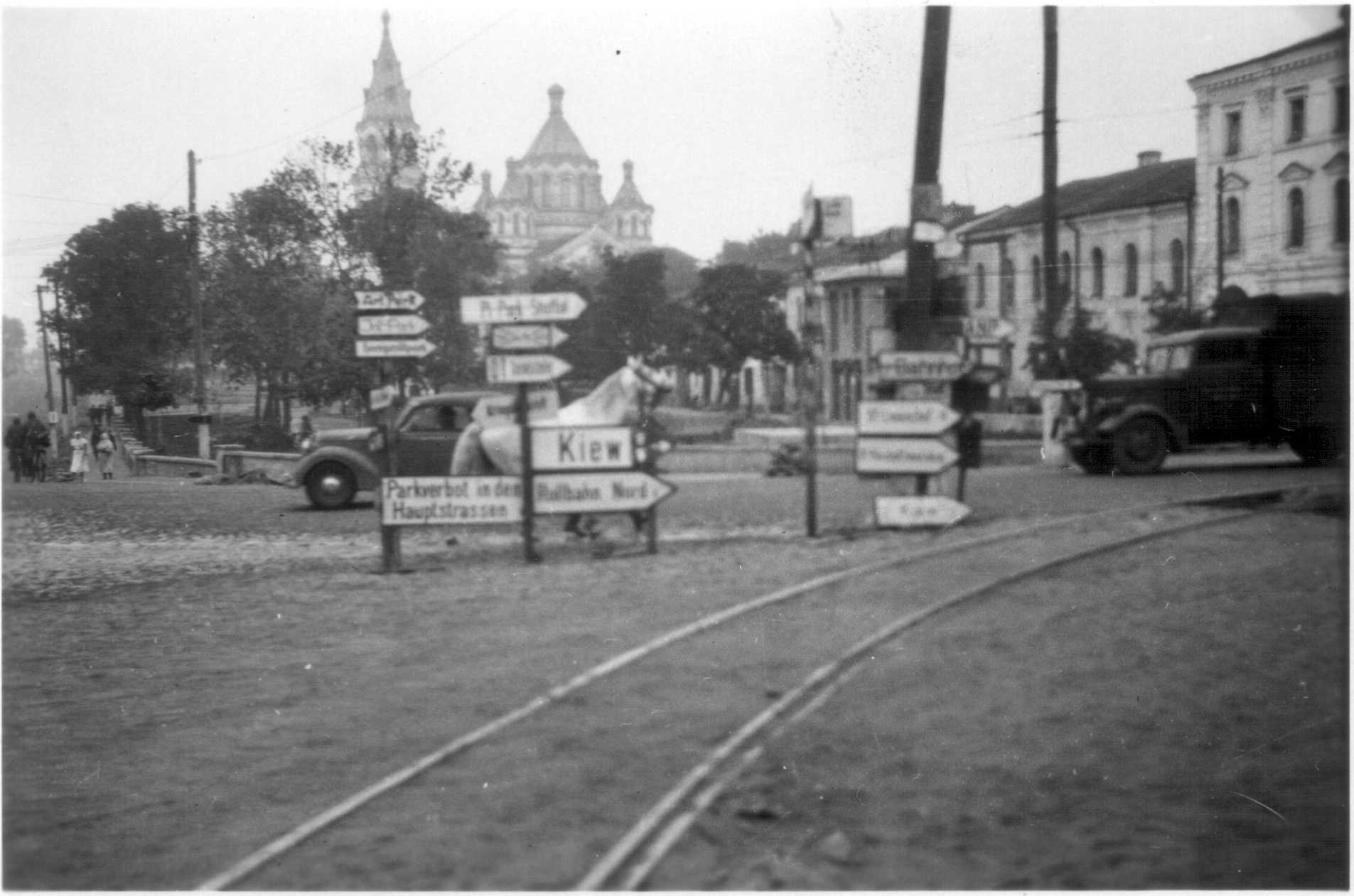
Zhytomyr during German occupation in World War II

During World War II Zhytomyr and the surrounding territory was for two and a half years (first from 9 July 1941 to 12 November 1943, and again from 19 November 1943 to 31 December 1943) under Nazi German occupation and was Heinrich Himmler's Ukrainian headquarters. The Nazi regime in what they called the "Zhytomyr General District" became what historian Wendy Lower describes as

a laboratory for… Himmler's resettlement activists… the elimination of the Jews and German colonization of the East—transformed the landscape and devastated the population to an extent that was not experienced in other parts of Nazi-occupied Europe besides Poland. [While]… [u]ltimately, the exigencies of the war effort and mounting partisan warfare behind the lines prevented Nazi leaders from fully developing and realizing their colonial aims in Ukraine… In addition to the immediate destruction of all Jewish communities, Himmler insisted that the Ukrainian civilian population be brought to a 'minimum.'

The Germans operated a Jewish forced labour battalion in the city.

Before the invasion, roughly 30,000 Jews lived in Zhytomyr, accounting for about one-third of the city's residents. More than 5,000 Jews were murdered between July and September 1941. In August 1941, the Nazis established a Jewish ghetto in Zhitomir by enclosing several streets within a small, overcrowded area. A census conducted on September 5, 1941, recorded 4,820 Jews living in the ghetto.

During July and August 1941, German security forces and police units carried out systematic mass murders of Jews in Zhitomir. By the end of August 1941, approximately 2,000 Jews had been murdered in Zhitomir.

After the September 1941 massacre, the remaining Jews in Zhitomir were confined to a forced labor camp, where doctors, craftsmen, and skilled workers were kept alive temporarily for labor, including construction projects for the German military. Throughout 1942, German forces and Ukrainian police carried out successive executions of the camp's prisoners, including 237 Jewish laborers on August 19 and additional mass shootings in October and November. By 1943, the remaining Jewish artisans were also murdered.

At the same time, Jewish Soviet prisoners of war held at POW Camp No. 358 were systematically separated from other prisoners and executed by SD forces in nearby woods. An estimated 1,200–1,400 Jewish POWs were killed during the camp's early months.

Of the approximately 7,000 Jews who were in Zhitomir when the Germans occupied the city in July 1941, only about 20 are known to have survived until the city's liberation. On November 12, 1943, Soviet forces captured Zhytomyr.

=== After WWII ===
During 1942-1949 Zhytomyr region was a territory of mild activity of UPA North branch of the Ukrainian Insurgent Army (UPA), whose members fought for the independence of Ukraine against Nazi Germany and the Soviet Union. After USSR defeated the Germans, Zhytomyr fell under Soviet rule and once again became a part of the Ukrainian Soviet Socialist Republic.

Between 1960s and 1980s Zhytomyr was one of the centres of dissident movement, with notable Ukrainian activists including Viacheslav Chornovil, Yevhen Sverstiuk, Ivan and Nadia Svitlychna, Alla Horska and Anatoliy Shevchuk, being active in the city. Many of them were put under KGB supervision, imprisoned and put into labour camps. In order to suppress dissent, Soviet authorities organized provocations aimed at souring the relations between local Ukrainian, Polish and Jewish communities.

Starting from 1989, pro-democracy demonstrations under Ukrainian national flags were taking place in the city, despite pressure from KGB. On 21 January 1990 many local inhabitants took place in the celebration of Unity Day. On 13 June 1990 Zhytomyr became Soviet Ukraine's fourth city after Ternopil, Ivano-Frankivsk and Lviv to hoist the national flag of Ukraine over its city council. On 24 August 1991 Ukrainian parliament announced Declaration of Independence of Ukraine. From 1991, Zhytomyr has been part of the independent and sovereign Ukraine.

=== 2022 Russian invasion ===
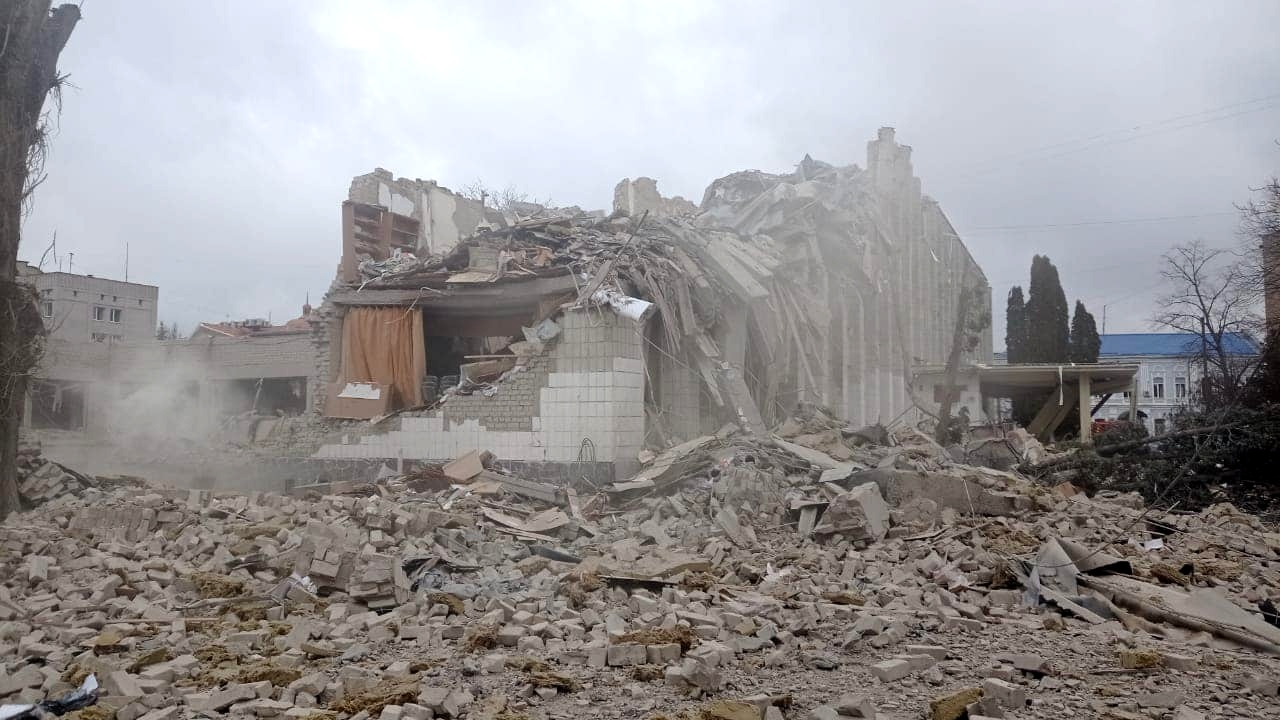
School in Zhytomyr after a Russian airstrike on 4 March 2022

During the 2022 Russian invasion of Ukraine, Zhytomyr and the surrounding area were subjected to several Russian air and missile strikes, such as the 2 March airstrike which damaged residential buildings, a thermal electricity plant, and two hospitals, killing at least two and injuring more than a dozen.

== Administrative division ==
The city is divided into two urban districts:

District	Population	Area
Bohunskyi District	153,700	30 km^{2}
Korolovskyi District	118,500	31 km^{2}

Microdistrict

The city of Zhytomyr contains the following areas (microdistricts):

- Bohunia
- Hydropark
- Hinchanka the Second
- Zavokzalny district
- Railway station area
- Korbutivka
- Kroshnia
- Maliovanka
- Marianivka
- Pavlykivka
- Putiatynka
- Rudnia
- Smokivka
- Smolianka
- Sokolova Hora
- Old Town
- Eastern microdistrict (folk name Poliova)
- Khmilnyki (folk name Malikova)
- Center

== Population ==
=== Demographic history ===
Year	Inhabitants
1860	33,700
1861	40,564
1891	69,785
1897	65,895; 31,000 Jews, 17,000 Russians, 9,000 Ukrainians, 7,000 Poles
1914	up to 90,000
1926	76,700 (39,1% Jews, 37,1% Ukrainians, 13,7% Russians, 7,3% Poles)
1939	95,100
1941	40,100 (mostly Russians along with Poles, Jews, and Germans in minority)
1956	95,000
2005	277,900
2015	269,493

=== Ethnic groups ===
Distribution of the population by ethnicity according to the 2001 census:

Ethnic groups in Zhytomyr
	percent
Ukrainians	82.92%
Russians	10.30%
Poles	4.91%
Belarusians	0.48%
Jews	0.47%
Germans	0.13%
Czechs	0.08%
Armenians	0.08%
Moldovans	0.07%

=== Language ===
Distribution of the population by native language according to the 2001 census:

Language	Number	Percentage
Ukrainian	235 245	83.18%
Russian	46 015	16.27%
Other or undecided	1 563	0.55%
Total	282 823	100.00%

According to a survey conducted by the International Republican Institute in April–May 2023, 82% of the city's population spoke Ukrainian at home, and 14% spoke Russian.

=== Roman Catholics ===
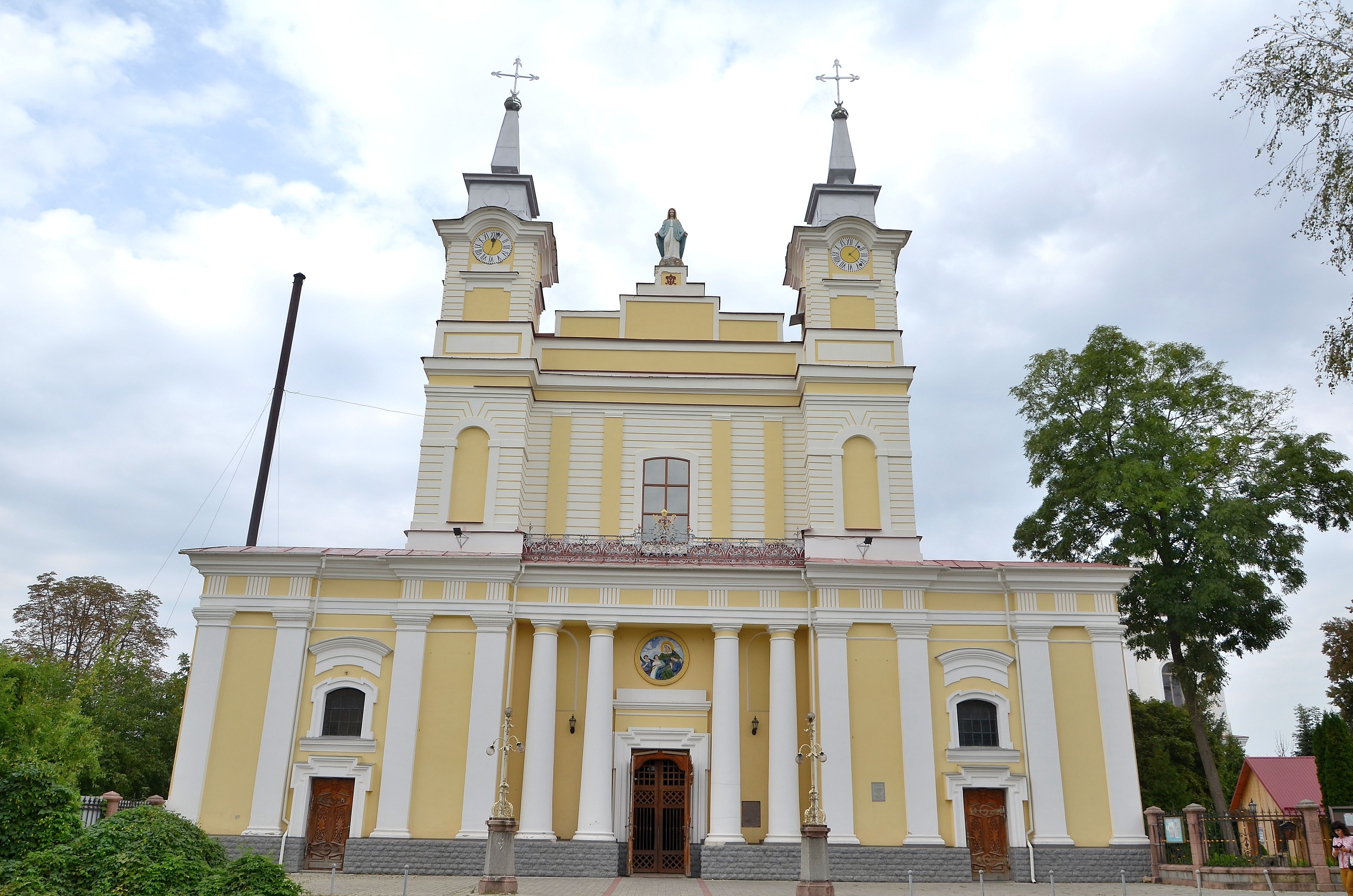
Saint Sophia Cathedral

Zhytomyr had been a Latin Catholic bishopric since 1321, until The See was suppressed in 1789 in favor of the Diocese of Lutsk and Zytomierz, until that was split up again in 1925, when it was restored as the Roman Catholic Diocese of Zhytomyr; that was formally suppressed in 1998 to establish the Diocese of Kyïv–Žytomyr, but actually the city retains the episcopal see in its Cathedral of the Holy Wisdom, while Kyiv (although first in the title and the national capital) only has a co-cathedral.

The Zhytomyr cemetery was opened in 1800. At first, it served Polish nobility from Volhynia, such as the Czeczel and the Woronicz families. Later, other Catholics were buried here, including Germans, Ukrainians and Russians.

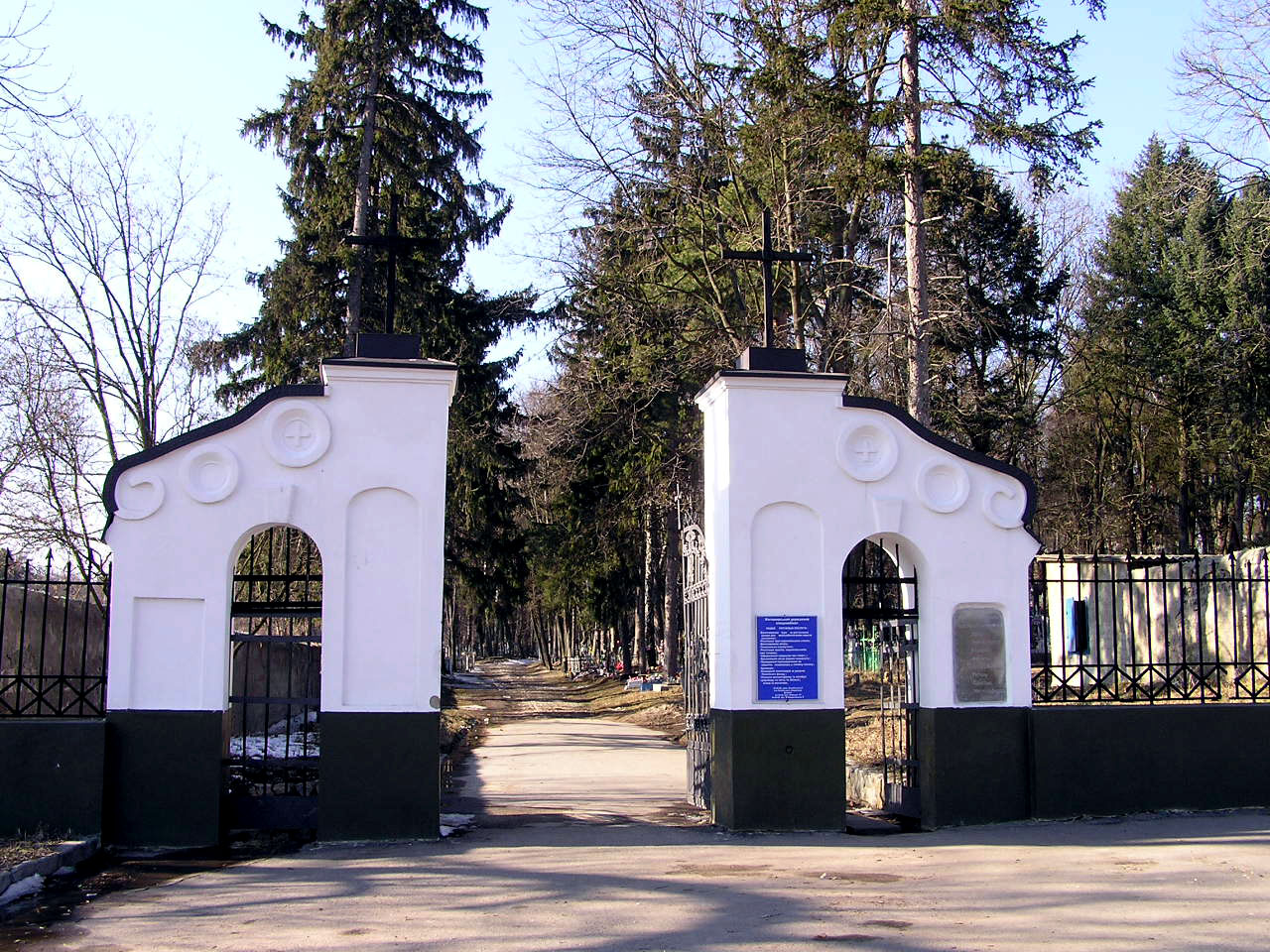
Polish Cemetery

In 1840, the Chapel of St. Stanislaus was built (now in ruins), and the cemetery was divided into nine districts, named after different saints. In the Soviet Union, the complex was devastated, now it is under the process of renovation.

Among most famous people buried here are:

- Bronislaw Matyjewicz-Maciejewicz, one of the first Polish air pilots
- Karol Niedzialkowski – bishop of Lutsk and Zhytomir in the late 19th century
- Apolinary Wnukowski – Roman Catholic archbishop and scholar
- Juliusz Zarębski – Polish composer
- parents of Ignacy Jan Paderewski
- the family of Stanisław Moniuszko

=== Jews in Zhytomyr ===
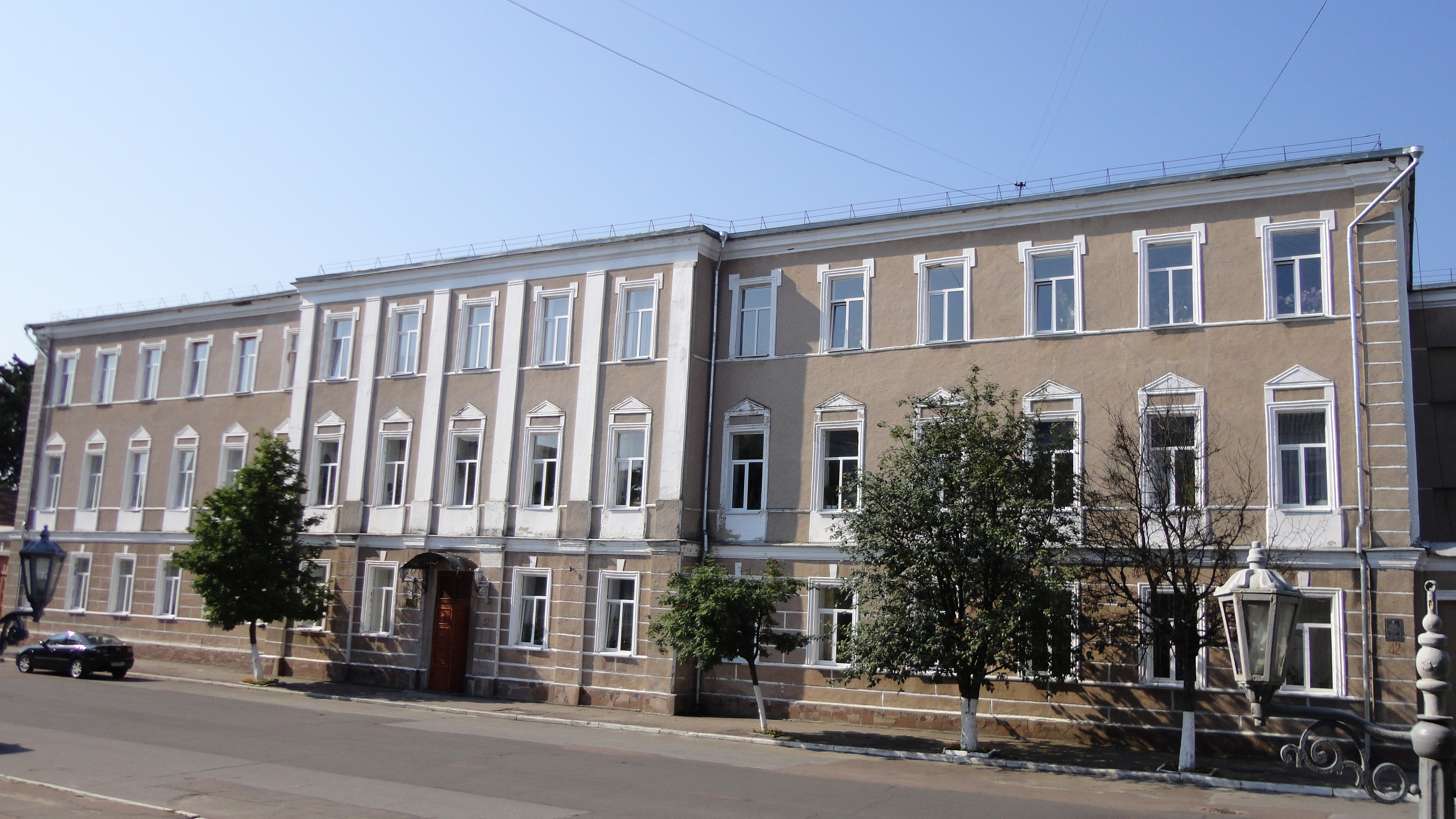
Zhytomyr Jewish Institute building

Zhytomyr apparently had few Jews at the time of the Khmelnytsky Uprising (1648), but by the time it became part of Russia in 1778, it had a large Jewish community, and was a center of the Hasidic movement. Jews formed nearly one-third of the 1861 population (13,299 of 40,564); thirty years later, they had somewhat outpaced the general growth of the city, with 24,062 Jews in a total population of 69,785. By 1891 there were three large synagogues and 46 smaller batei midrash. The proportion of Jews was much lower in the surrounding district of Zhytomyr than in the city itself; at the turn of the century (circa 1900) there were 22,636 Jews in a total population of 281,378.

In Imperial Russia, Zhytomyr held the same status as the official Jewish center of southern part of the Pale of Settlement as Vilnius held in the north. The printing of Hebrew books was permitted only in these two cities during the monopoly of Hebrew printing from 1845 to 1862, and both were chosen as the seats of the two rabbinical schools which were established by the government in 1848 in pursuance of its plans to force secular education on the Jews of Russia in accordance with the program of the Teutonized Russian Haskalah movement. The rabbinical school of Zhytomyr was considered the more Jewish, or rather the less Russianized, of the two (Ha-Meliẓ, 1868, No. 40, cited in Jewish Encyclopedia). Its first head master was Jacob Eichenbaum, who was succeeded by Hayyim Selig Slonimski in 1862. The latter remained at the head of the school until it was closed (together with the one at Vilnius) in 1873 because of its failure to provide rabbis with a secular education who would be acceptable to the Jewish communities. Suchastover, Gottlober, Lerner, and Zweifel were among the best-known teachers of the rabbinical school at Zhytomyr, while Abraham Goldfaden, Salomon Mandelkern, and Abraham Jacob Paperna were among the students who later became famous in the Jewish world.

The Jewish community of Zhytomyr suffered pogroms:

1. On 7–8 May 1905, when the section of the city known as "Podol" was devastated, and 20 were killed within the city.
2. On 7–10 January 1919, 15 young Jewish neighbors were killed when they came to defend, and the Christian student Nicholas Blinov, also attempting to defend, likewise died. Ten young Jews from nearby Chudnov were also killed while on their way to aid the Jews of Zhytomyr.
3. Beginning on 22 March 1919, according to witnesses, the 317 deaths were fewer than might have been, due to both Christian sheltering efforts and the return of the Bolshevik troops within a few days.

The Jewish community of the region was largely destroyed in the Holocaust. The killing began as early as October 1941 when a majority of the city's Jews were driven from the town to destinations unknown, leaving about only 5,000 Jews. In the four months beginning with Himmler's 25 July 1942 orders, "all of Ukraine's shtetls and ghettos lay in ruins; around 3,000 Jewish men, women, and children were murdered by stationary and mobile SS-police units with local Ukrainian auxiliaries."

Today, the Zhytomyr Jewish community numbers about 5,000. The community is a part of the "Union of Jewish Communities in Ukraine" and the city and district's rabbinate. Rabbi Shlomo Vilhelm, who came to the city as a Chabad emissary in 1994, serves as rabbi. Other Jewish institutions are also active in the city, including the Joint and its humanitarian branch "Chesed" and the Jewish Agency.

The community has an ancient synagogue in the city center which has a mikveh. Chabad operates in the city various educational institutions which have residence in a village next to the city.

== Culture ==
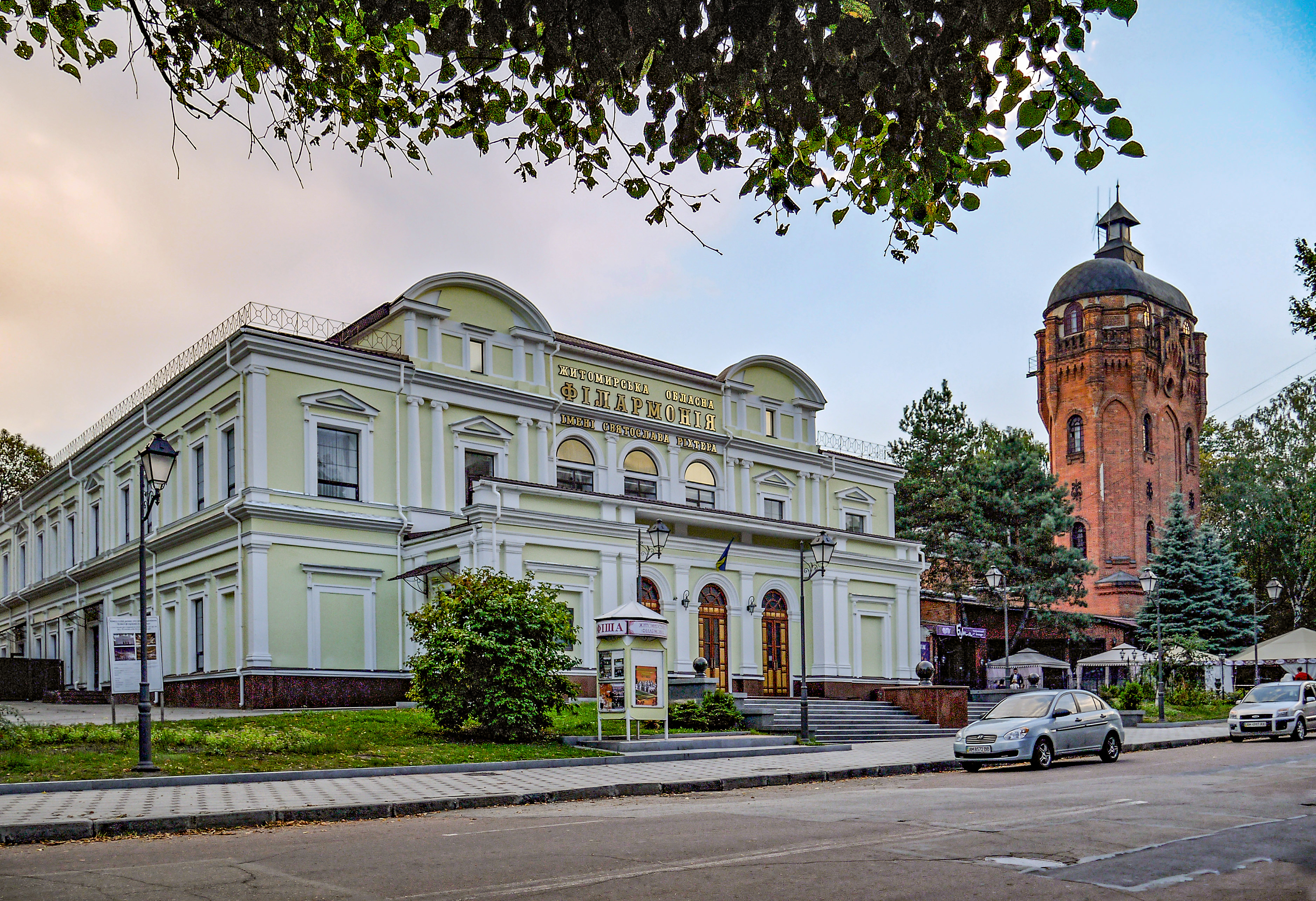
Philharmonia theater and old water tower

The city has 2 state theaters and a philharmonic, more than 10 museums, libraries and planetarium.

One of the world-famous museums of cosmonautics Serhiy Pavlovych Korolyov Museum of Cosmonautics is located in the city.

=== Theaters and music ===
In 1809, the first stationary theater building was built in Zhytomyr on the initiative of Volyn governor M. I. Кomburley.

In 1858, the first stone theater in Ukraine was built (now it houses the regional state philharmonic). M. Kropyvnytskyi, M. Zankovetska, V. Komisarzhevska, I. Aldridge, P. Viardot performed here.

In 1966, a new theater building was built with a large auditorium for 943 seats and a small one for 70 seats, a lobby with an area of 550 m2, rehearsal halls, dressing rooms, offices, production shops.

Currently in the city work:

- Academic Ukrainian Music and Drama Theater named after Ivan Kocherga;
- Academic Regional Puppet Theater;
- Philharmonic named after Svyatoslav Richter.

Since 1973, the Zhytomyr Academic Dance Ensemble "Sun" exists in the city.

The internationally renowned chamber choir OREYA is based in the city.

Famous composers Borys Lyatoshynsky and Sviatoslav Richter were born in Zhytomyr.

=== Museums ===
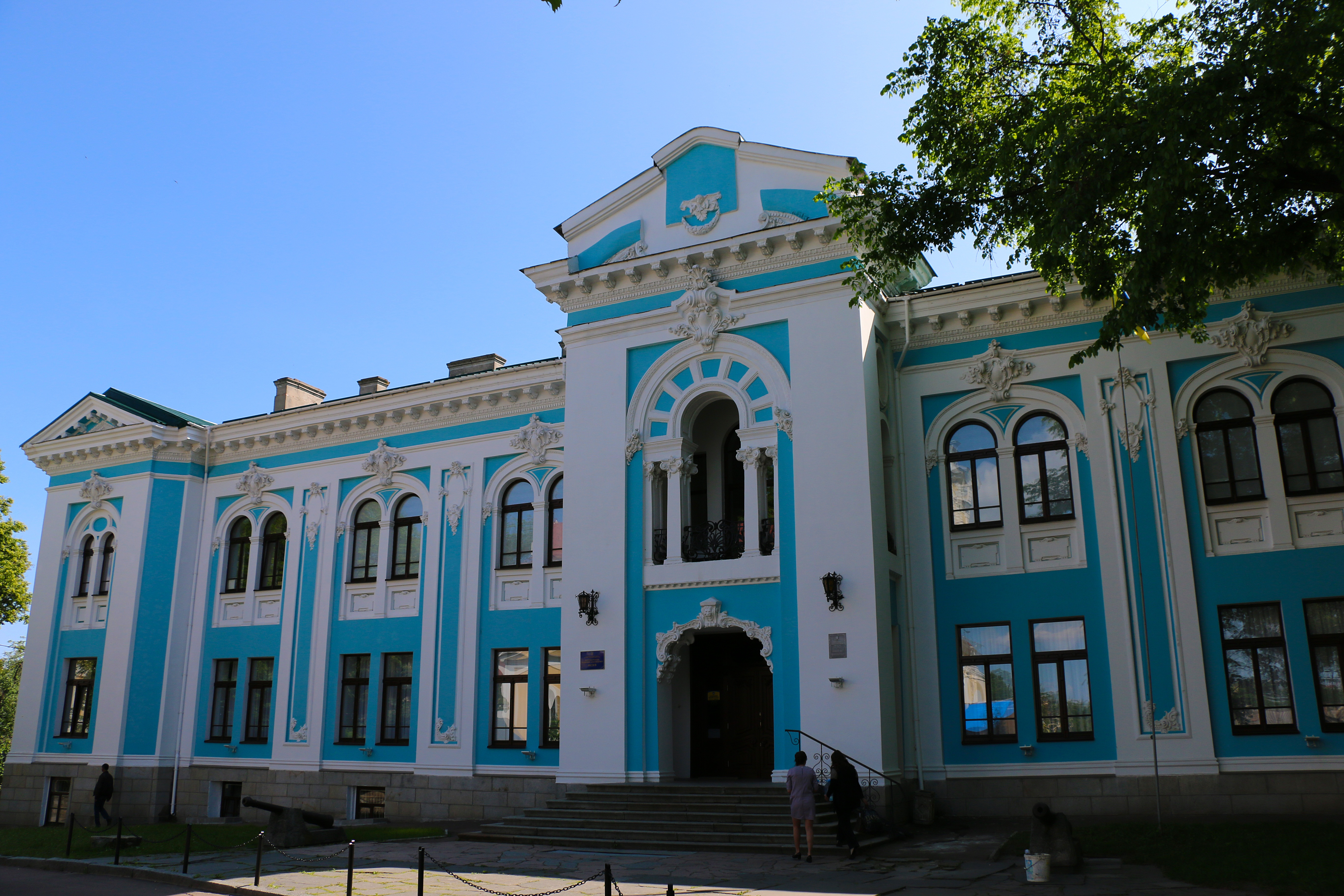
Local History Museum

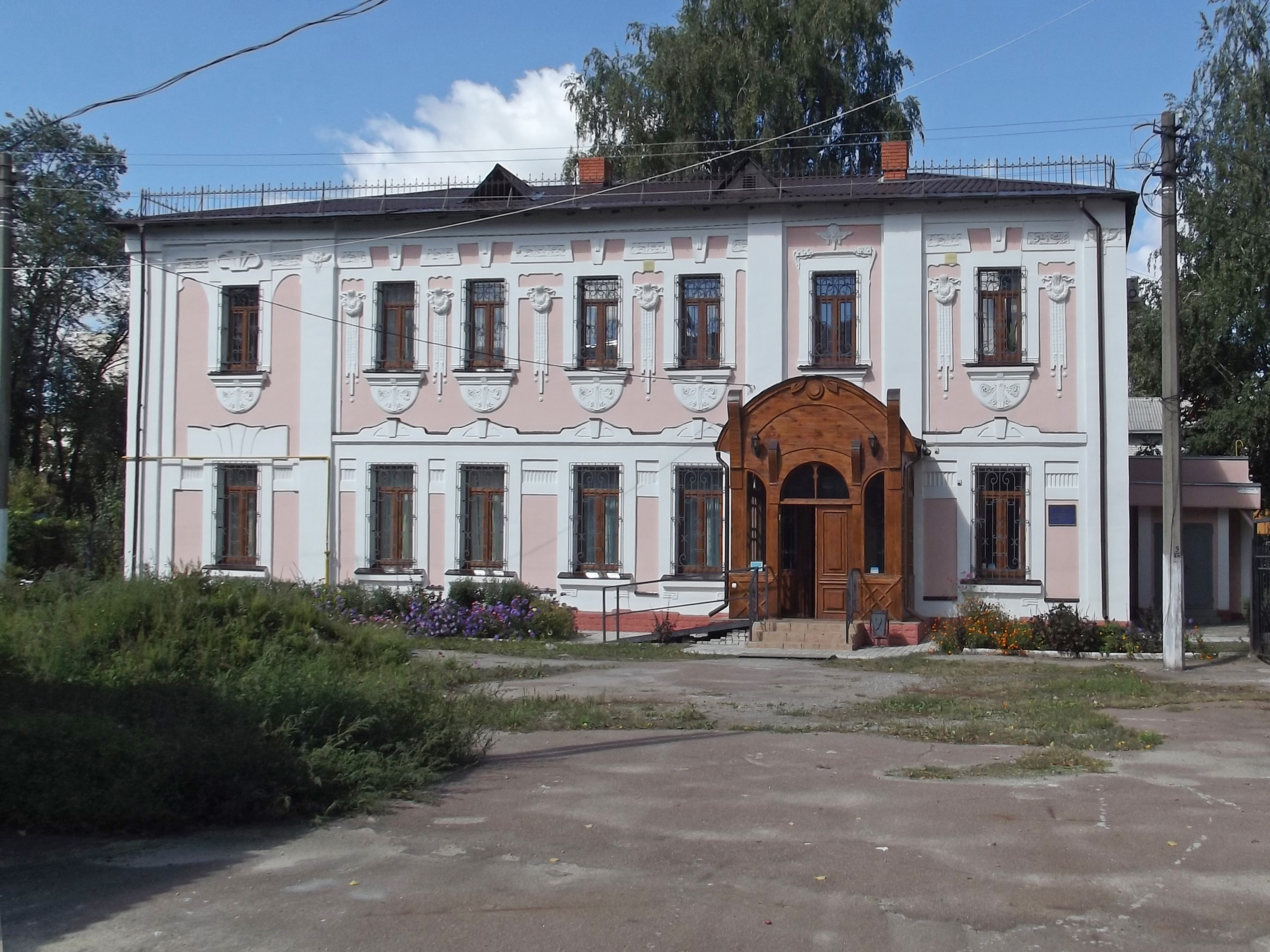
Regional Literary Museum

The following museums operate in Zhytomyr:

- historical and local lore museum;
- art gallery;
- museum of nature;
- V. G. Korolenko Literary Memorial Museum;
- memorial house-museum of academician Sergei Korolev;
- literary museum of Zhytomyr Region;
- museum of the history of fire protection;
- Sergei Pavlovich Korolyov Museum of Cosmonautics.

=== Libraries ===
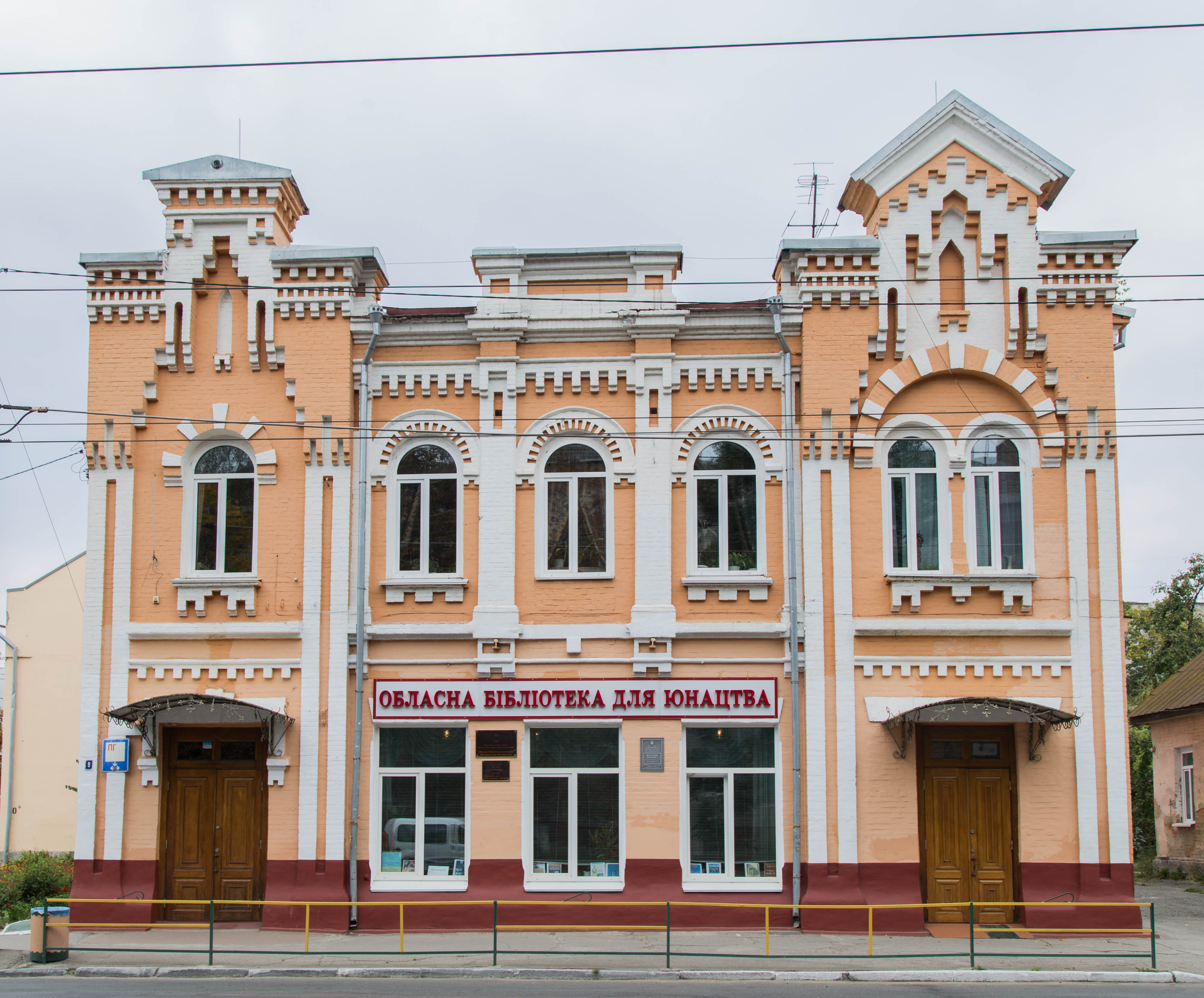
Regional Library for Youth

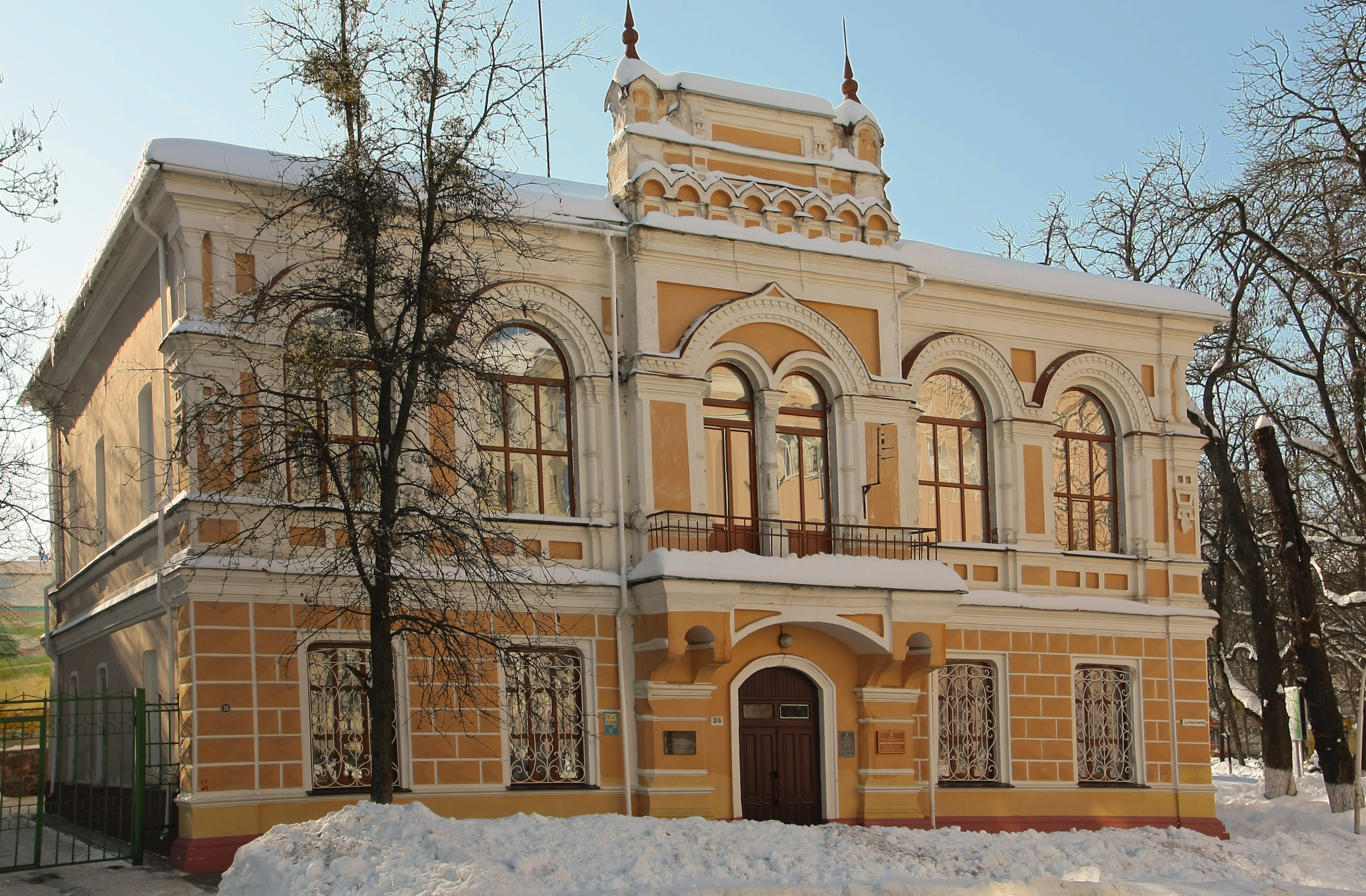
Regional Library for Children

- Zhytomyr Regional Universal Scientific Library named after O. Olzhych;
- Zhytomyr Regional Scientific Medical Library;
- Zhytomyr Regional Library for Youth;
- Zhytomyr Regional Library for Children.

=== Architecture: sights and monuments ===
The city has 74 historical monuments, 24 archeological monuments, and 15 monuments of monumental art (one of which is of national importance). Monuments of architecture and urban planning of state importance — 10, local significance — 72.

Monuments of historical, cultural and religious significance in the city of Zhytomyr include:

- Cells of the Jesuit monastery (1724);
- Holy Dormition Bishops Cathedral in Podil (1874);
- Church of St. James;
- Seminary Church of St. John of Dukla;
- Saint Sophia Cathedral;
- St. Michael's Cathedral;
- Holy Exaltation of the Cross Cathedral;
- Transfiguration Cathedral;
- Lutheran Church;
- Water tower.

In 1996, the Memorial to the Victims of Fascism was erected in Bohunia by the sculptor Yosyp Tabachnyk (a memorable location of the Bohunіa concentration camp for prisoners of war).

== Geography ==
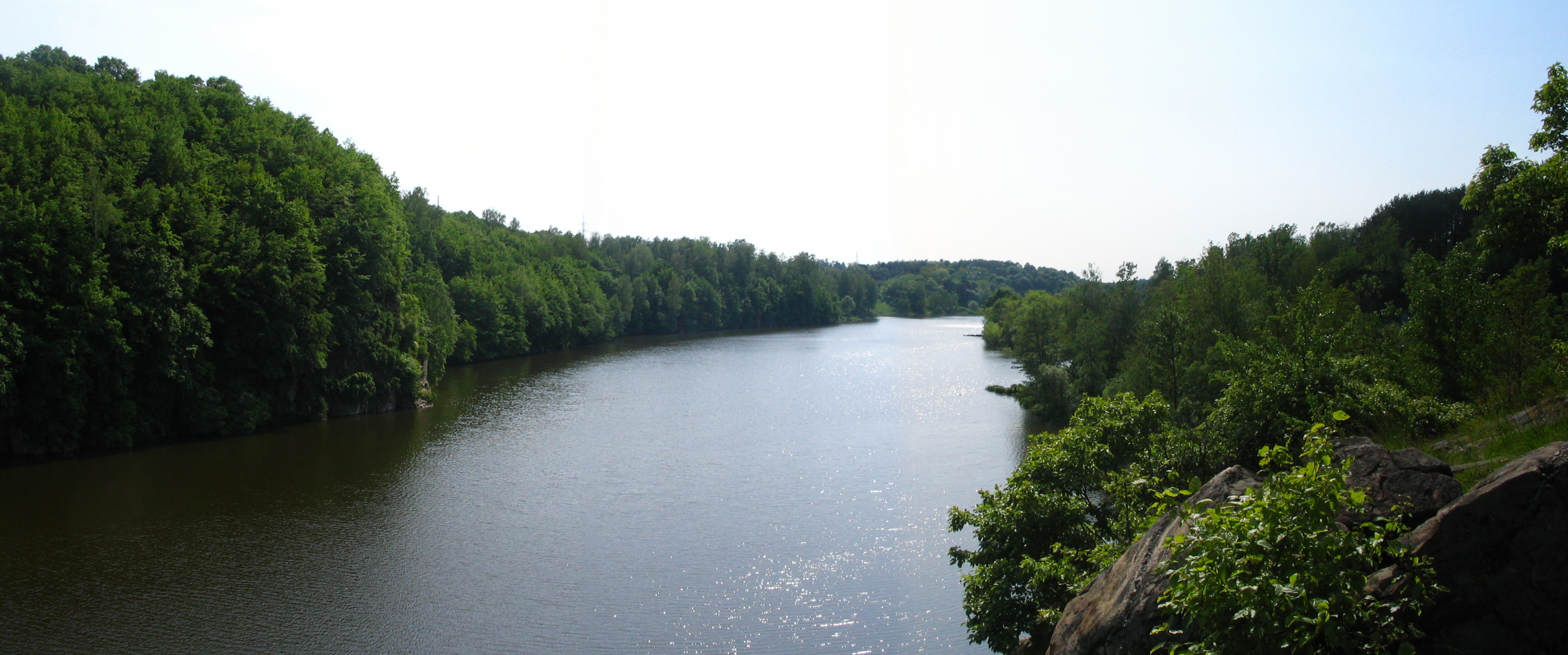
Teteriv River in Zhytomyr

Zhytomyr lies in a unique natural setting; all sides of the city are surrounded by ancient forests through which flow the Teteriv, Kamianka, Kroshenka and Putiatynka rivers. The Teteriv river generally forms the southern boundary of Zhytomyr, though there are also some small areas of Zhytomyr city territory below the southern bank of the river. The city is rich in parks and public squares.

Zhytomyr is set out on a mostly radial type of street net with the centre at the main public square of the city, named Sobornyi Maidan (which means Cathedral Square). A building containing courts and some other institutions is in the west of the square. Before 1991, this building contained Zhytomyr Oblast Committee of the Communist Party. Just behind the building (that is to the west of Sobornyi Square) is a small quiet park, bearing the name of Zamkova Gora (Castle Mountain) and containing a monument-type boulder with an inscription stating that this is a place where Zhytomyr was founded. This historical centre of Zhytomyr is in the south part of the city. The old part of Zhytomyr is on three rocky hills over the river Kamianka: Okhrimova, Zamkova, and Petrovska.

The old town is surrounded by new housing estates, the names of which are often borrowed from the former suburban villages or reflect the longstanding occupations common in these places. The main streets connecting Sobornyi Maidan with the outskirts of Zhytomyr are Kyivska Street or Kyiv Street (going to northeast, to the railway station and also to the main bus station of the city), Velyka Berdychivska Street (going to southeast), Lech Kaczyński Street (going southwest; its further continuation is Chudnivska Street going to beaches and a forest-type park near the river of Teteriv), and Peremohy Street (going north).

The best-known street in the central part of Zhytomyr is Mykhailivska (named after St. Michael's Church at the northern end of the street). The street is about 500 metres to the east of Sobornyi Maidan and runs approximately from north to south, connecting some points at the above-mentioned Kyivska Street and Velyka Berdychivska. Mykhailivska Street is for pedestrian traffic: vehicles are forbidden, with the exception of some slow-moving ones. A puppet theatre is nestled in the middle of the street, while the building of the Zhytomyr City Council is at its southern end. Several small coffee houses and cafés have sprung up here recently, frequented by locals from all walks of life and of all ages. If one crosses Velyka Berdychivska Street from the southern end of Mykhailivska Street, then one finds oneself at Korolyov Square containing the building of the Zhytomyr Oblast Council. Crossing Kyivska Street from the northern end of Mykhailivska Street, one can continue to go along Pokrovska Street, another important long avenue of Zhytomyr (going north).

The best-known park of Zhytomyr is named after Yuri Gagarin, in the south of the city, at the left (northern) bank of the Teteriv River. It was formerly owned by the Baron de Chaudoir.

=== Climate ===
Climate data for Zhytomyr (1991–2020, extremes 1948-present)
Month	Jan	Feb	Mar	Apr	May	Jun	Jul	Aug	Sep	Oct	Nov	Dec	Year
Record high °C (°F)	14.8 (58.6)	17.4 (63.3)	27.0 (80.6)	30.0 (86.0)	32.6 (90.7)	34.4 (93.9)	35.6 (96.1)	38.3 (100.9)	36.0 (96.8)	26.1 (79.0)	22.0 (71.6)	15.3 (59.5)	38.3 (100.9)
Mean daily maximum °C (°F)	−0.8 (30.6)	0.7 (33.3)	6.4 (43.5)	14.7 (58.5)	20.7 (69.3)	23.9 (75.0)	25.8 (78.4)	25.3 (77.5)	19.5 (67.1)	12.8 (55.0)	5.5 (41.9)	0.5 (32.9)	12.9 (55.2)
Daily mean °C (°F)	−3.3 (26.1)	−2.4 (27.7)	2.2 (36.0)	9.3 (48.7)	14.9 (58.8)	18.4 (65.1)	20.1 (68.2)	19.2 (66.6)	14.0 (57.2)	8.1 (46.6)	2.6 (36.7)	−1.8 (28.8)	8.5 (47.3)
Mean daily minimum °C (°F)	−5.6 (21.9)	−5.2 (22.6)	−1.5 (29.3)	4.2 (39.6)	9.1 (48.4)	12.8 (55.0)	14.6 (58.3)	13.5 (56.3)	9.0 (48.2)	4.1 (39.4)	0.1 (32.2)	−4.0 (24.8)	4.2 (39.6)
Record low °C (°F)	−35.0 (−31.0)	−28.0 (−18.4)	−25.0 (−13.0)	−8.8 (16.2)	−2.7 (27.1)	1.0 (33.8)	1.1 (34.0)	2.3 (36.1)	−3.9 (25.0)	−10.7 (12.7)	−24.0 (−11.2)	−30.5 (−22.9)	−35.0 (−31.0)
Average precipitation mm (inches)	37 (1.5)	35 (1.4)	39 (1.5)	41 (1.6)	64 (2.5)	77 (3.0)	80 (3.1)	60 (2.4)	57 (2.2)	41 (1.6)	45 (1.8)	42 (1.7)	618 (24.3)
Average precipitation days (≥ 1.0 mm)	8.8	8.5	8.6	7.5	8.6	9.1	9.5	6.8	7.2	7.1	8.0	9.2	98.9
Average relative humidity (%)	84.5	81.7	74.7	65.6	66.7	69.7	71.9	70.5	75.4	79.7	85.6	86.6	76.1
Source 1: Pogoda.ru.net
Source 2: NOAA (precipitation and humidity 1991-2020)

== Economy ==
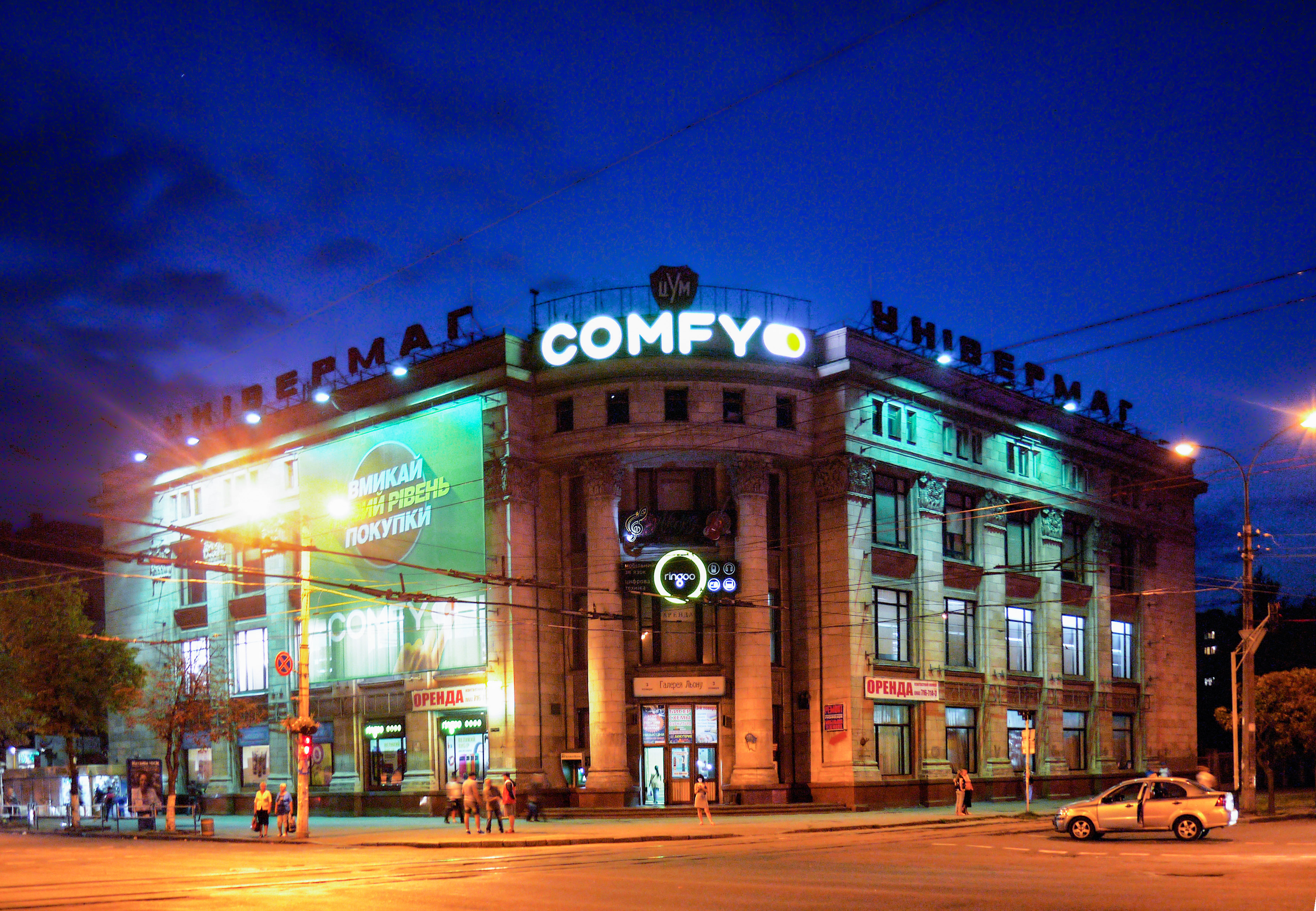
Zhytomyr central department store

Zhytomyr is an important economic center in the region. Enterprises in the city include glass, metal fabrication, electronic devices, screens, fabrics, furniture, shoes and others. In addition, there is a large pharmaceutical factory in Zhytomyr. Since 1944, a confectionery factory (ALC "ZhL") has operated in Zhytomyr; the enterprise is one of the leaders of the Ukrainian confectionery market.

The city is home to the Zhytomyr Armoured Vehicle and Tank Factory. The factory has been one of the main repair facilities in Ukraine since the start of the Russo-Ukrainian War, running on 3 shifts. In September 2014 it was announced that the Ministry of Defence of Ukraine had placed a ₴280 million order with the factory.

== Transport ==
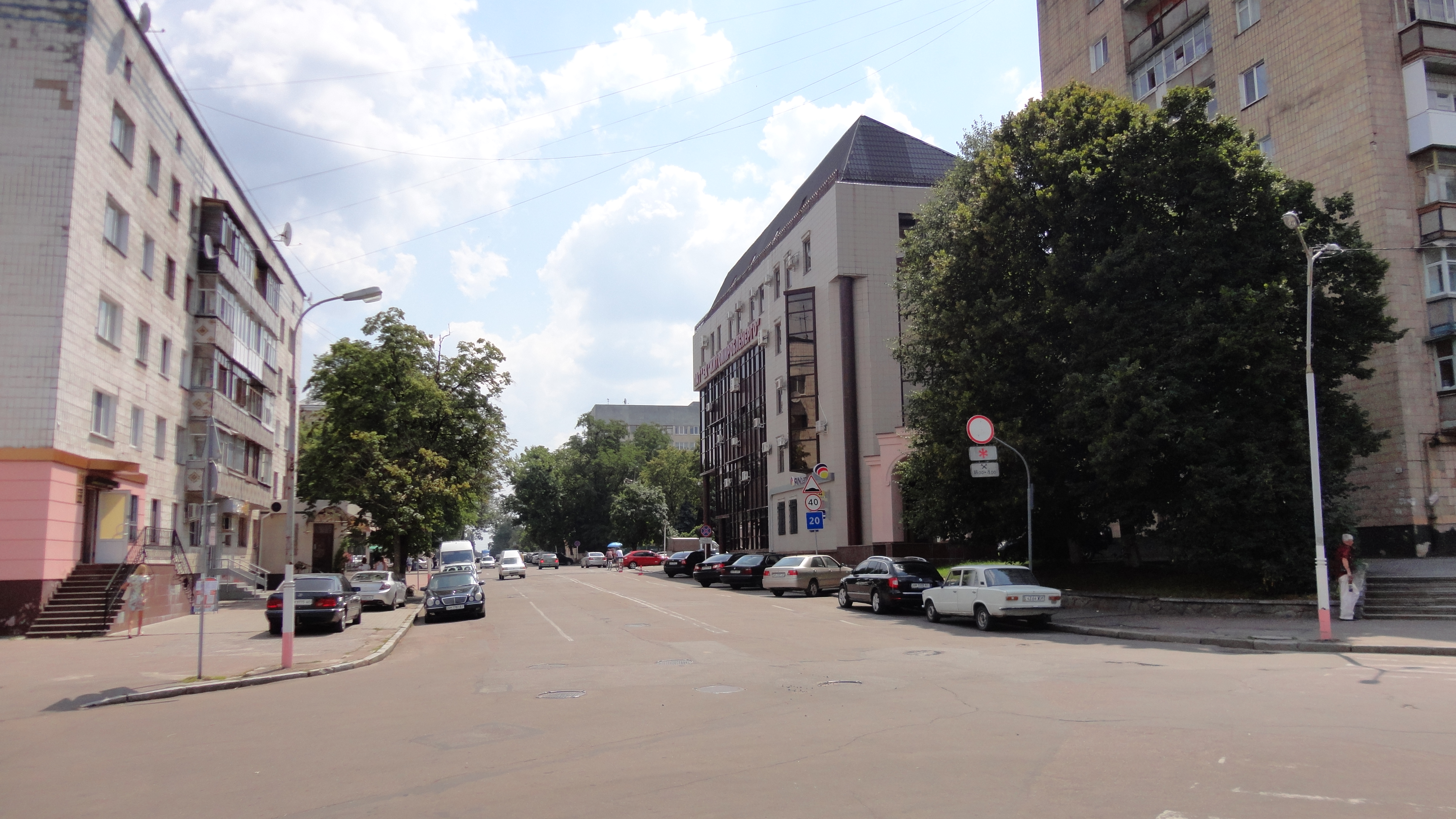
Pushkinska Street

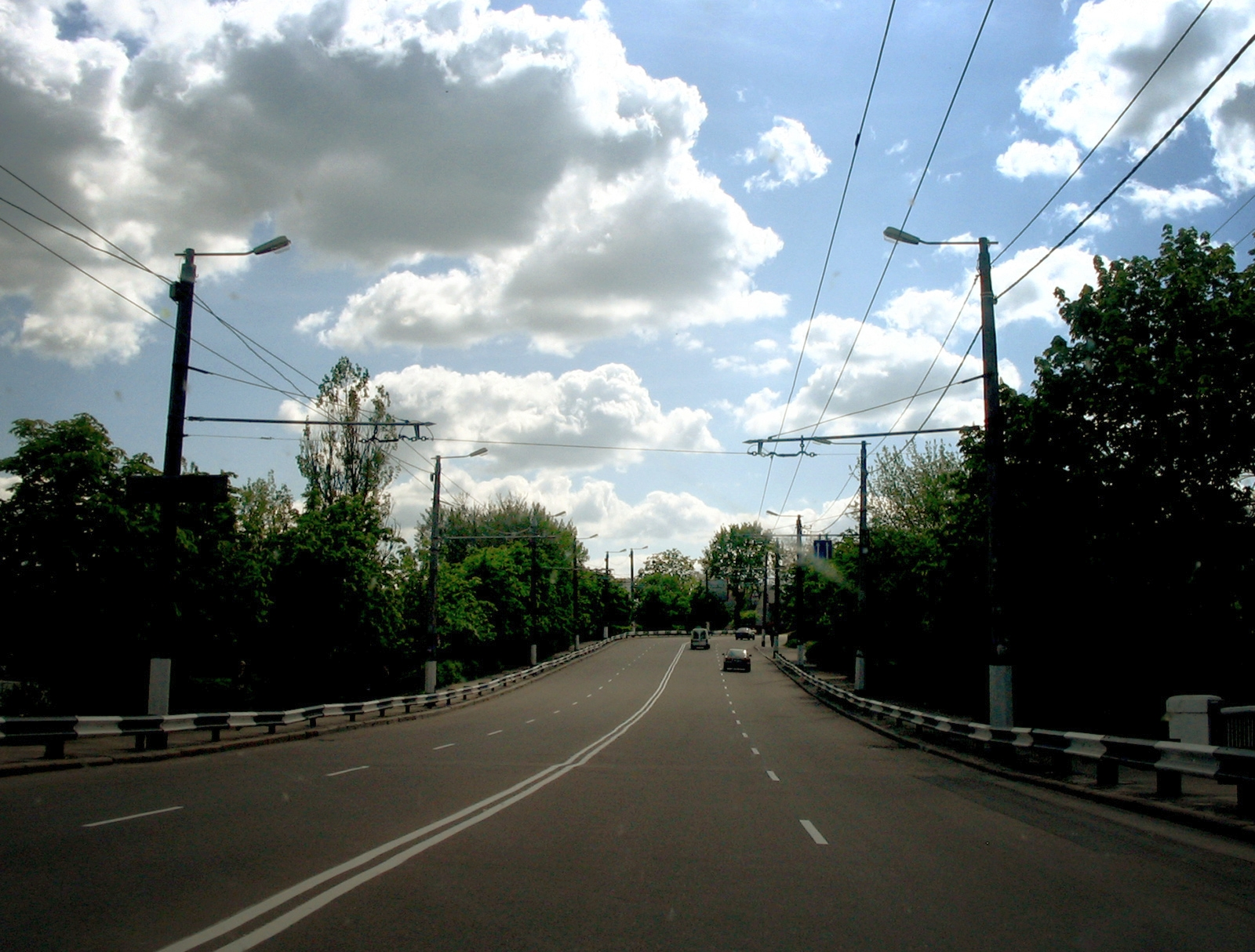
Chudnivskyi bridge

In ancient times, the city was on the important road from Kyiv to the city of Brest-Litovsk. Now this road is of international highway M 06 E40 connecting Kyiv to the Hungarian border near Chop.
Some other roads:

- M 21 E583 connecting the cities Roman and Zhytomyr (through Vinnytsia)
- H 03 Zhytomyr - Chernivtsi (through Khmelnytskyi)
- P18 Zhytomyr - Stavyshche (through Skvyra)
- P28 Zhytomyr – checkpoint "Vystupovychi" of the Ukrainian-Belarusian border (through Korosten).

Railways connect Koziatyn with Zhytomyr (through Berdychiv), Korosten, Zviahel, Korostyshiv and Fastiv. In 2011 a stretch of the Fastiv – Zhytomyr rail line was electrified.
Zhytomyr is about 131 kilometers from Kyiv (by road 140 km, by rail 165 km).

The following trains pass through Zhytomyr train station (both directions for all):

- Zhytomyr - Korosten
- Vinnytsia - Korosten
- Zhytomyr - Korostyshiv
- Korosten - Koziatyn
- Zhytomyr - Koziatyn
- Zhytomyr - Zviahel
- Zhytomyr - Fastiv

The city has an airport called Zhytomyr Airport. Since 1939, the "Smokivka" airport had been operating in Zhytomyr. On 30 December 2015, the State Aviation Administration has reneved the certificate and included it in the register of the Ukrainian civil airfields, allowing Zhytomyr International Airport to receive aircraft and carry out air transportation. Since the beginning of Russia's full-scale invasion of Ukraine, the airport has been temporarily out of operation, as are all airports in Ukraine.

Zhytomyr has three bus stations connecting it with many other cities and villages in Ukraine and abroad.
Zhytomyr has fifteen bridges and junctions built over rivers and roads. There is a 30-kilometer ring road around Zhytomyr. The most interesting bridge in Zhytomyr is one over the Teteriv River in Gagarin Park (named after Yuri Gagarin).

=== Public city transport ===
Common kinds of public transport shuttling within Zhytomyr are trolleybuses, trams, buses, and minibuses. There are also electric trams, but currently on one route only. Earlier there were several tram routes in Zhytomyr, but all excepting one were canceled during a period of domination of the opinion that a tram is a bad kind of transport. Trams began to shuttle in Zhytomyr in 1899, has been one of the first cities in Ukraine to introduce tram service. Trolleybuses appear in Zhytomyr in 1962. The total length of Zhytomyr city electric transport routes (trolleybuses and trams) is 275 km. Zhytomyr is the first city in Ukraine to implement e-ticket system in all municipal public transport.

=== Attack on Zhytomyr ===
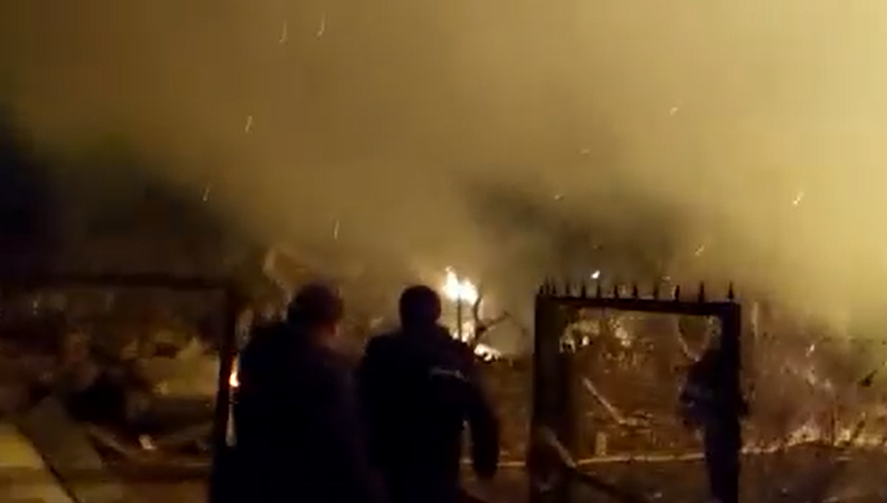
The Zhytomyr Airport reduced to rubble after being struck by 2 Iskander missiles launched from Belarus.

On 27 February 2022, the city's public airport Zhytomyr Airport was directly attacked by 2 Iskander missiles launched from Belarus, during the Russian invasion of Ukraine, which had recently started three days prior to the attack on Zhytomyr Airport.

== Twin towns – sister cities ==
Zhytomyr is twinned with:

- Bytom, Poland
- Dazhou, China
- (Georgia (country)) Kutaisi, Georgia
- Montana, Bulgaria
- Płock, Poland
- Shangla, Pakistan

== Notable people ==
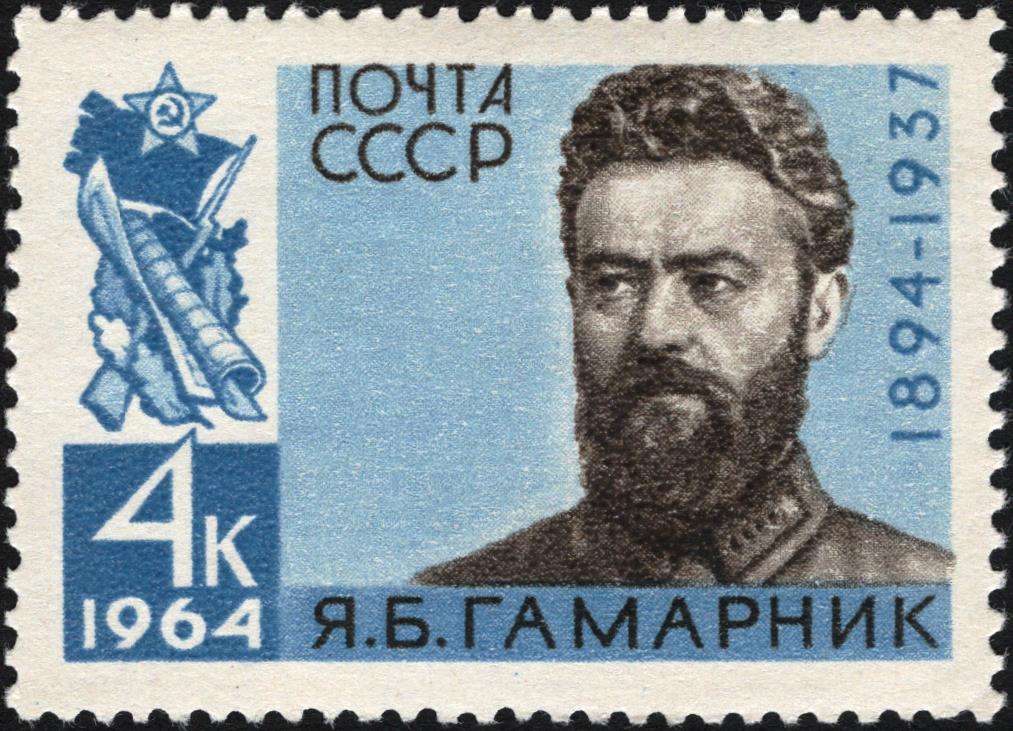
Yakov Gamarnik on a 1964 Soviet stamp

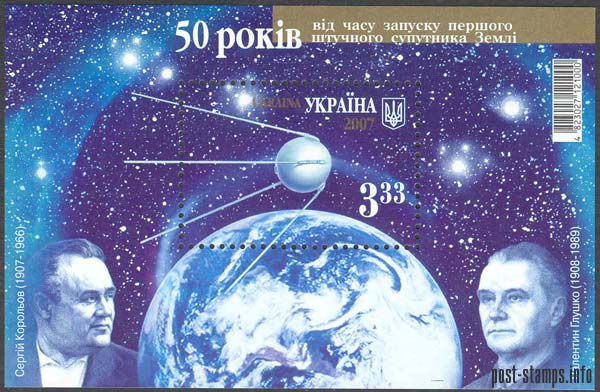
Sergei Korolev (left) on a 2007 Ukrainian stamp

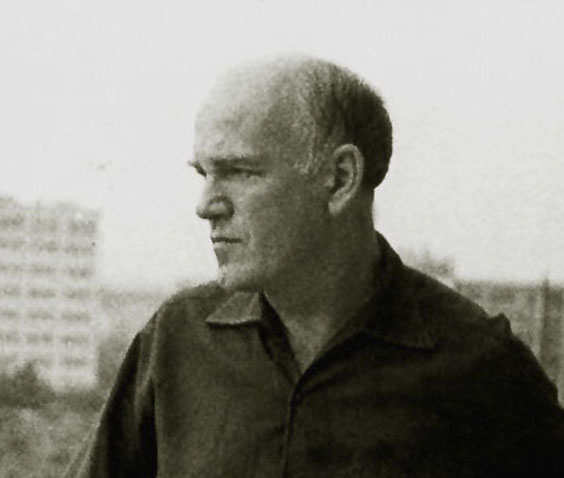
Sviatoslav Richter, 1966

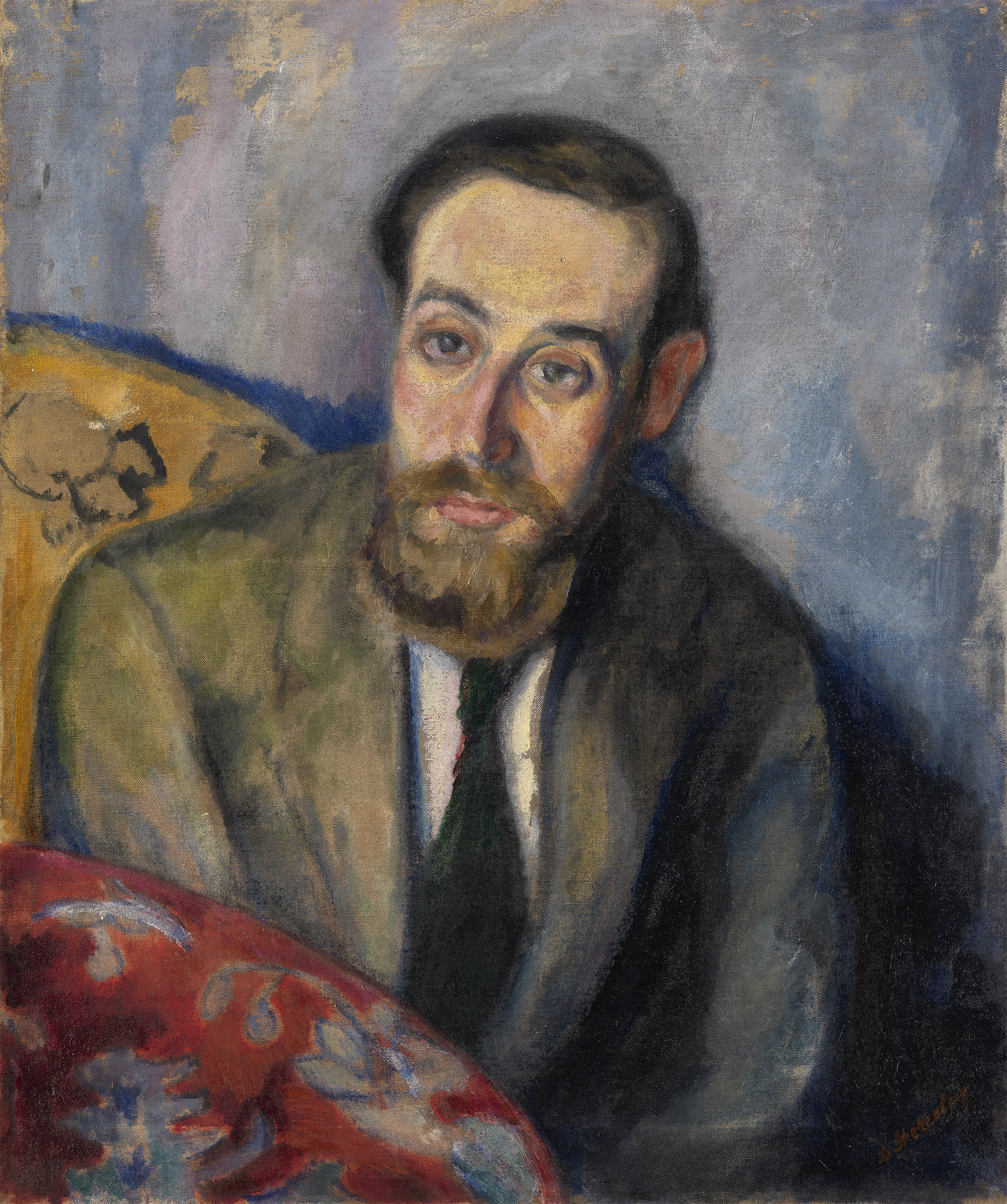
David Shterenberg, self portrait

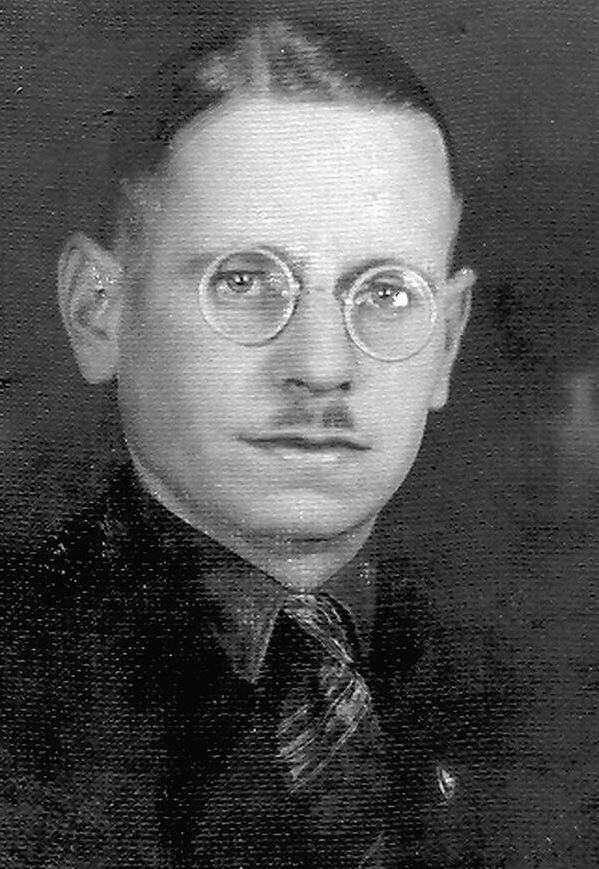
Mykola Stsiborskyi

- Naphtali Hirsch Altschuler (16th–17th centuries), Talmudic scholar and writer
- Ossip Bernstein (1882–1962), Russian-French Grandmaster chess player and businessman
- Aleksandr Bezymensky (1898–1973), a Soviet poet, screenwriter and journalist.
- Hayim Nahman Bialik (1873 in Ivnytsia – 1934), Hebrew poet, educated in Zhytomyr
- Adolpho Bloch (1908 in Zhytomyr - 1995), Brazilian-Ukrainian media magnate
- Sasha Boole (born 1989), Ukrainian country and folk musician, and singer / songwriter
- Tadeusz Borowski (1922–1951), a Polish writer and journalist.
- Ina Bourskaya (1886–1954), an American opera singer.
- Jarosław Dąbrowski (1836–1871), Polish nobleman and Paris Commune revolutionary
- Boris Didkovsky (1883–1937) Bolshevik revolutionary, Soviet geologist and University rector
- Oksana Dyka (born 1978), a Ukrainian operatic soprano.
- Luis Filcer (1927–2018), a Mexican Expressionist painter dealing with injustice and struggle.
- Samuel Freedman (1908–1993), Canadian judge, Manitoba Chief Justice
- Yakov Gamarnik (1894–1937), Soviet Communist militant and military commander
- Jewgeni Grischbowski (born 1992), a Dj and Music Producer.
- Vladimir Hachinski (born c. 1945), clinical neuroscientist and researcher into stroke and dementia
- Valentin Hrabovsky (1937–2004), author, poet, and art critic
- Mark Kharitonov (1937–2024) Russian novelist, poet, and essayist
- Alexander Kipnis (1891–1978), German then US bass opera singer
- Vladimir Korolenko (1853–1921), Russian writer, journalist and human rights activist
- Sergei Korolev (1907–1966), rocket engineer and designer, head of the Soviet space program
- Keni Liptzin (1856–1918), Jewish actress in Yiddish theatre
- Borys Lyatoshynsky (1895–1968), a Ukrainian composer, conductor and teacher.
- Julian Movchan (1913–2002), a Ukrainian-American journalist, writer and doctor.
- Donia Nachshen (1903–1987) a British book illustrator, produced gov't posters in WWII.
- Franciszek Niepokólczycki (1900–1974), a colonel of Polish Army.
- Oleh Olzhych (1907–1944), Ukrainian writer and nationalist militant
- Myroslav Popovych (1930–2018), Ukrainian philosopher
- Abram Ranovich (1885–1948), Soviet scholar of classical antiquity and religion.
- Zvi Ribak (1910–1994), a Jewish painter
- Sviatoslav Richter (1915–1997), a distinguished Soviet pianist
- Michael Rostovtzeff (1870–1952), a Russian historian and archaeologist
- Esther Salaman (1900–1995), a Russian-born Jewish writer and physicist.
- Igor Shafarevich (1923–2017), a Soviet and Russian mathematician, did algebraic number theory
- Valeriy Shevchuk (1939–2025), Ukrainian writer
- David Shterenberg (1881–1948), a Russian Soviet painter and graphic artist.
- Apollon Skalkowski (1808–1898), Russian and Ukrainian scientist, historian, writer and publisher
- Andriy Slyusarchuk (born 1971) a Ukrainian mnemonist and fraudster
- Mykola Stsiborskyi (1897–1941), leader of the Organization of Ukrainian Nationalists
- Vladimir Veksler (1907–1966), an experimental physicist, pioneer of the particle accelerator
- Natalia Vlaschenko (born 1960), journalist, screenwriter, TV presenter, playwright and columnist.
- Bruno Zach (1891–1935), an Austrian art deco sculptor of Genre art
- Casimir Zagourski (1883–1944), a Polish photographer active in Central Africa 1924–44
- Juliusz Zarębski (1854–1885), a Polish composer and pianist.
- Zev Wolf of Zhitomyr (died 1798), an Hassidic Rabbi.

=== Sport ===
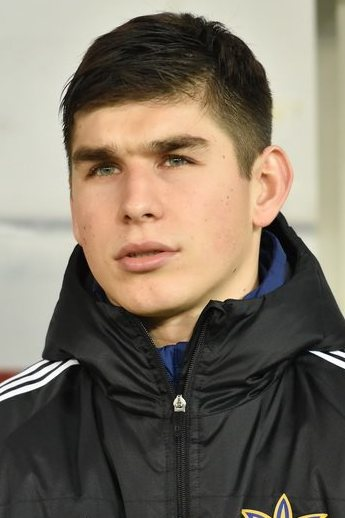
Ruslan Malinovskyi, 2015

- Anastasiya Chernenko (born 1990), a professional triathlete
- Aderinsola Eseola (born 1991), a Ukrainian footballer with over 200 club caps
- Ruslan Malinovskyi (born 1993) a Ukrainian footballer with over 300 club caps and 49 for Ukraine
- Viktor Rudyi (born 1962), a retired Soviet and Ukrainian football player with 510 club caps.
- Vyacheslav Shabranskyy (born 1987), boxer, fought for the WBO light-heavyweight title in 2017.
- Danylo Sikan (born 2001), a Ukrainian footballer with over 50 club caps and 6 for Ukraine
- Andriy Tkachuk (born 1987), a Ukrainian football midfielder with over 400 club caps
- Yuriy Vernydub (born 1966), a Ukrainian football coach and former player with 462 club caps.

== Gallery ==
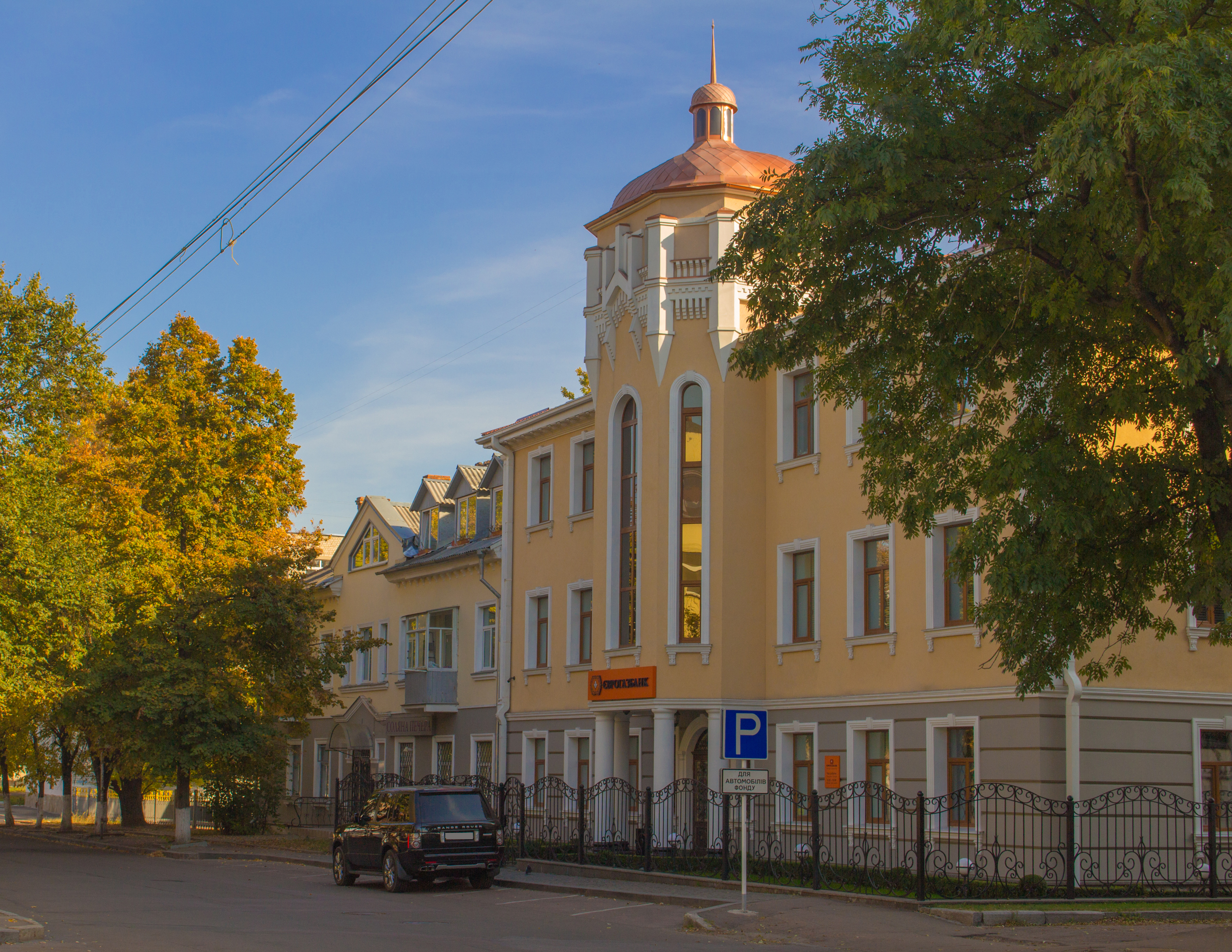
Typical old Zhytomyr architecture

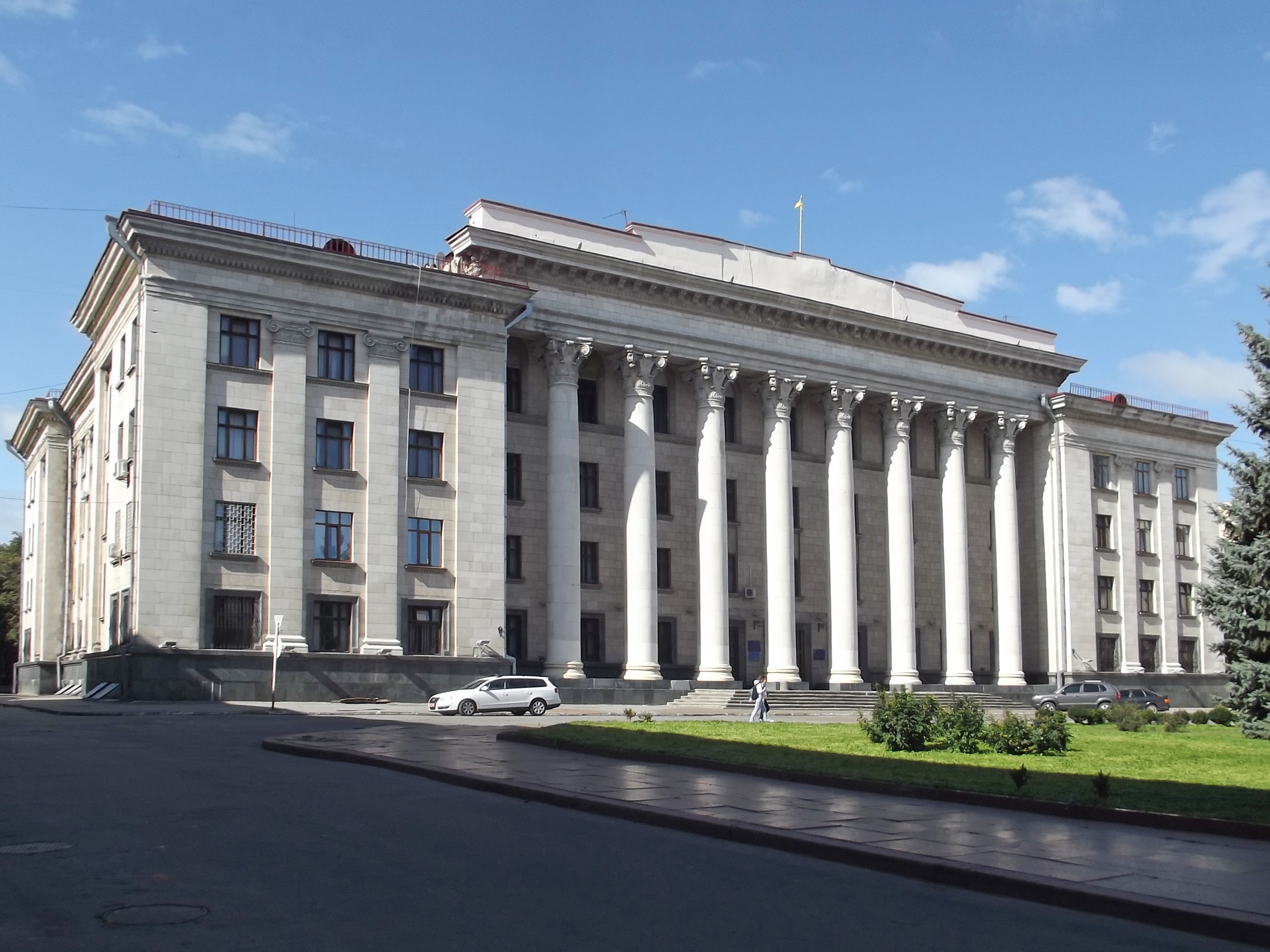
Court building

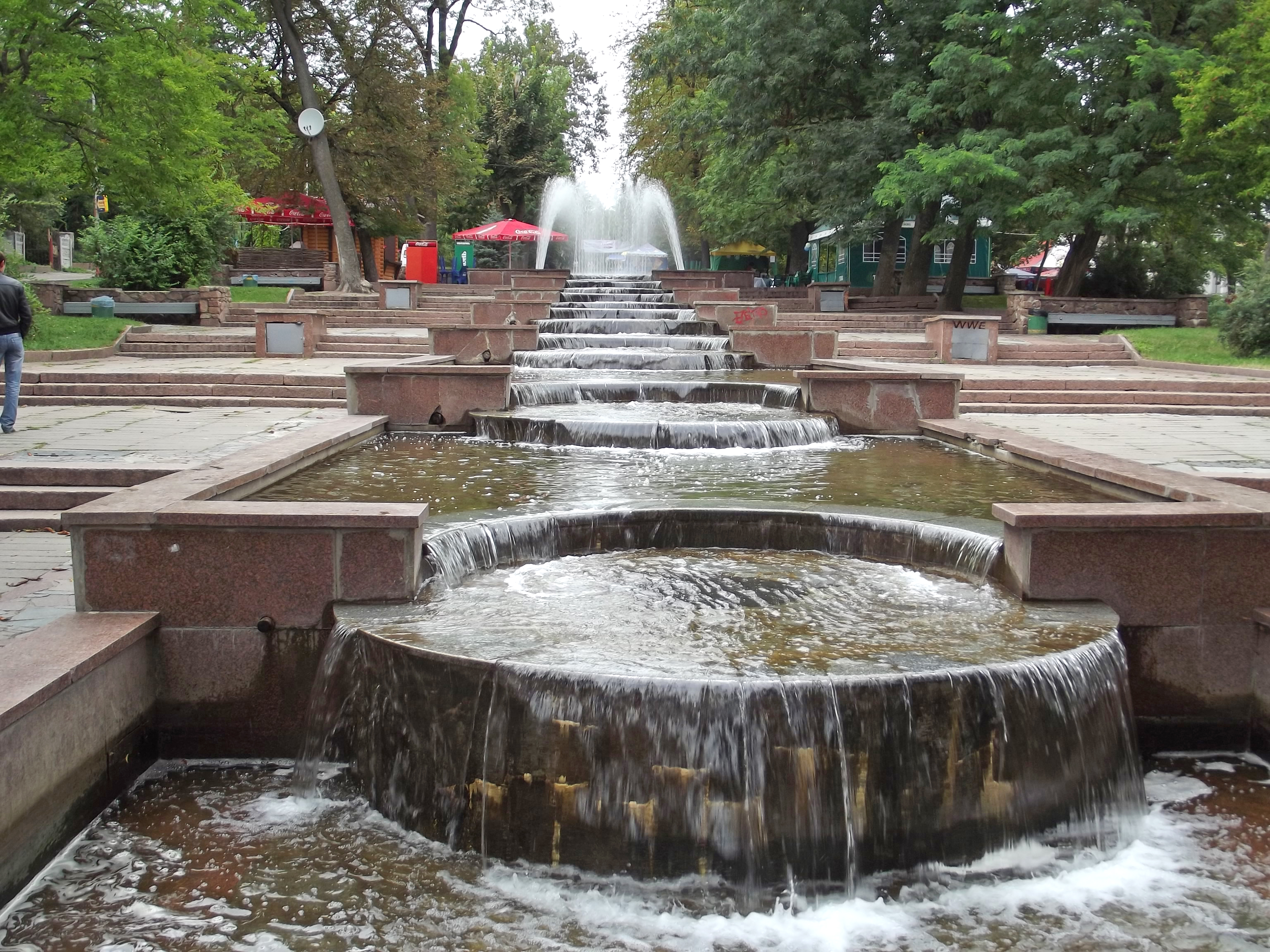
Fountains in Gagarin park

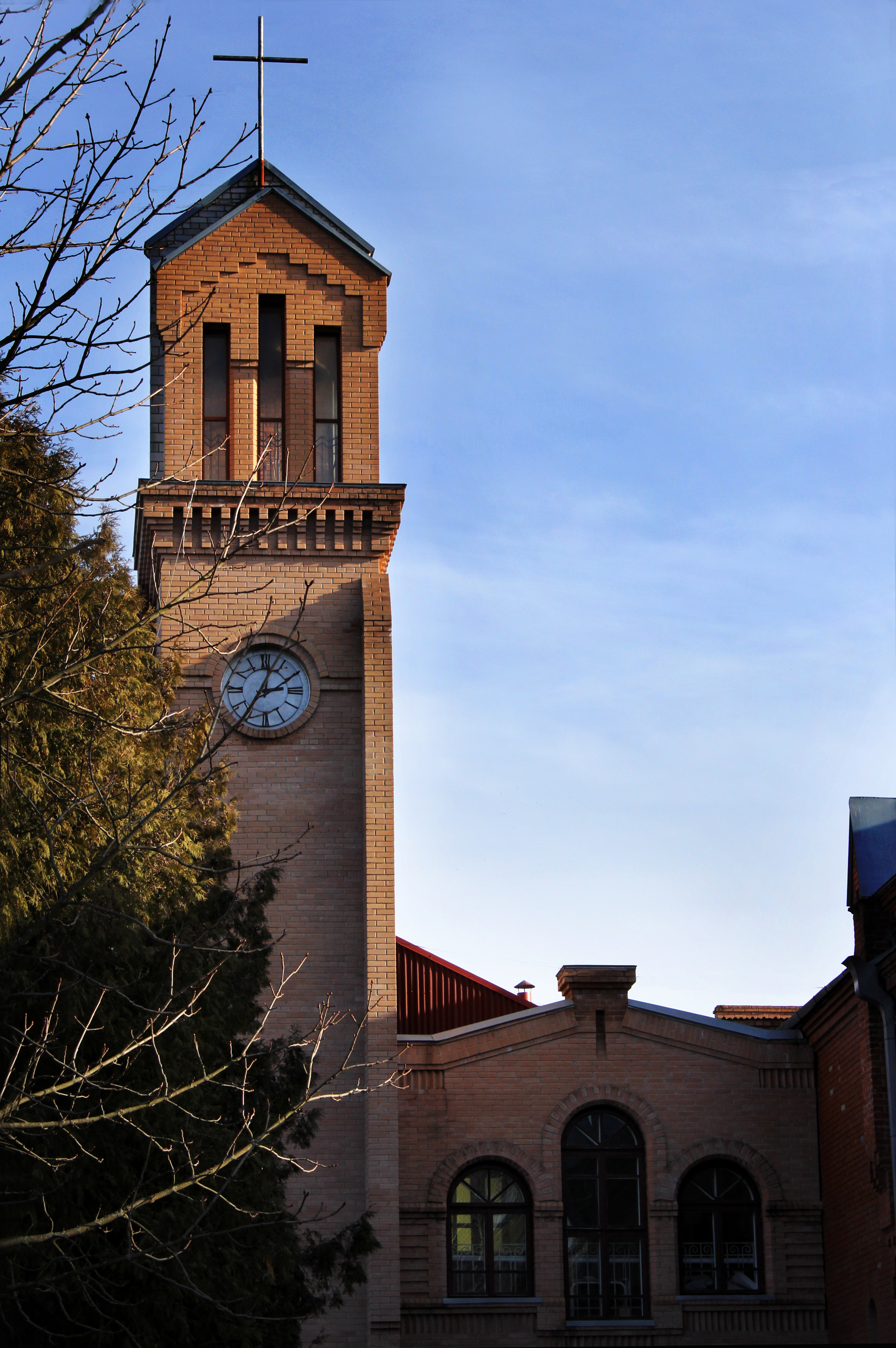
Chapel of the Lutheran Church

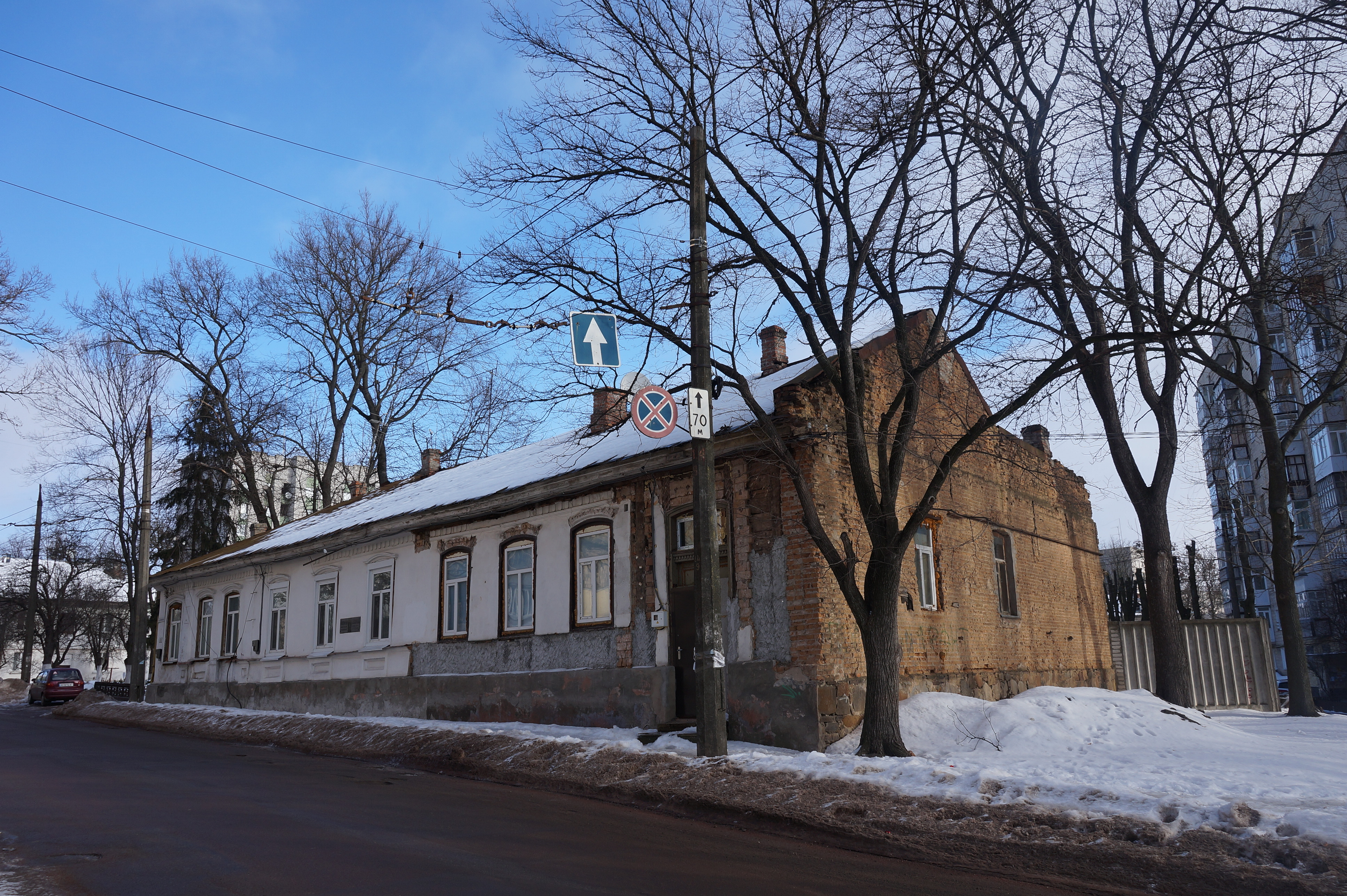
Former home of writer Józef Ignacy Kraszewski

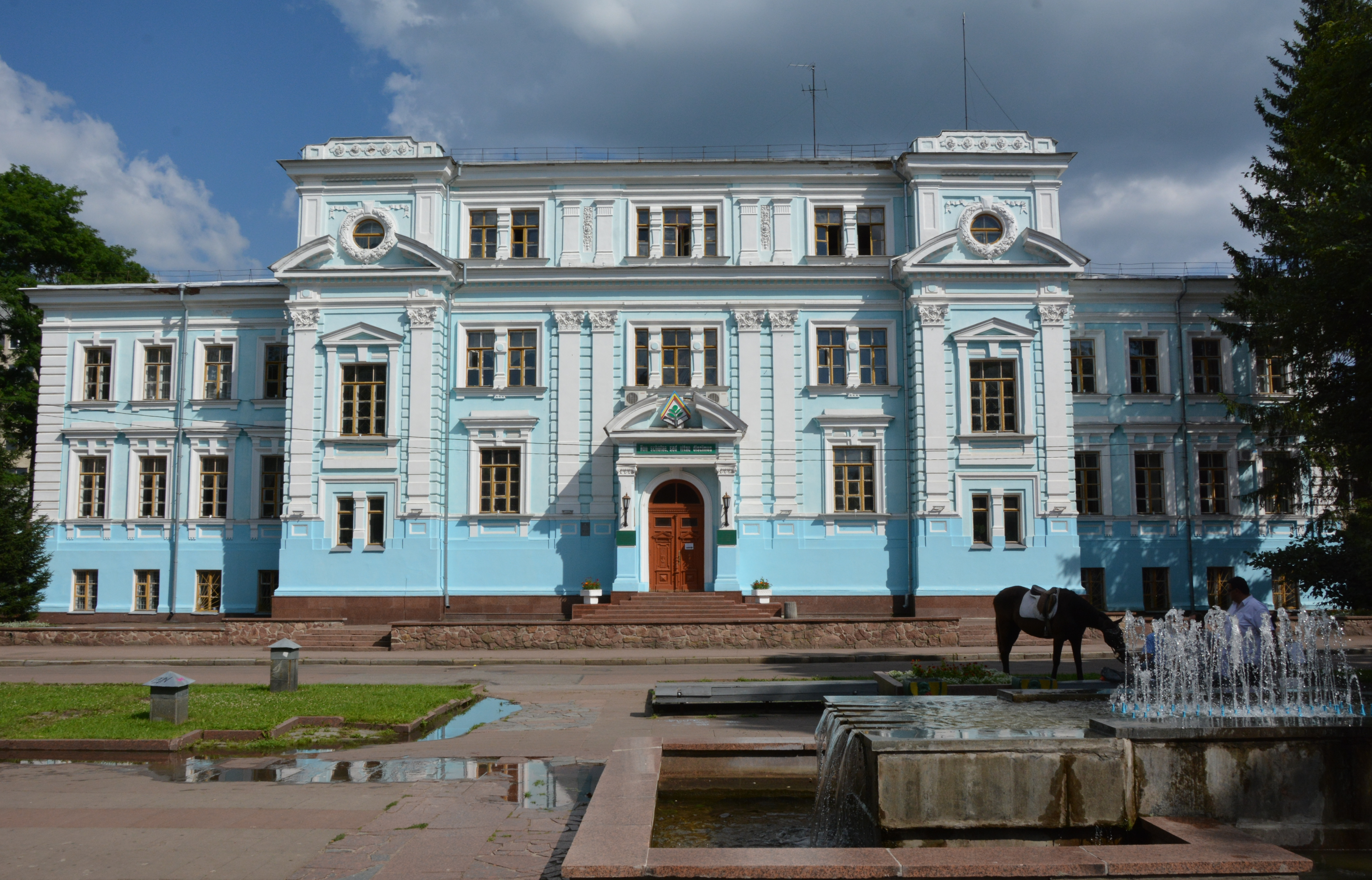
The National University of Agriculture in Zhytomyr

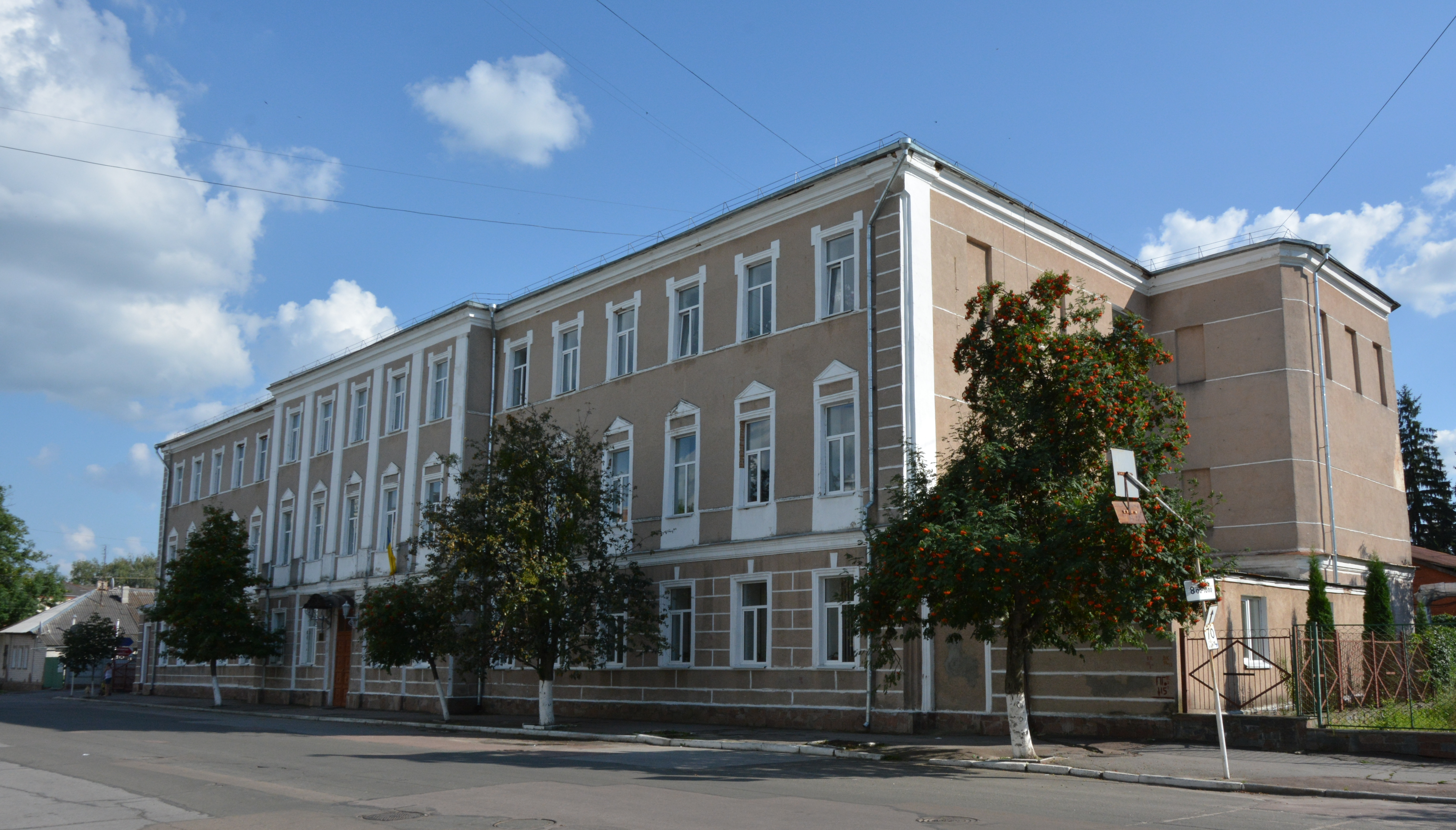
Zhytomyr state technology university

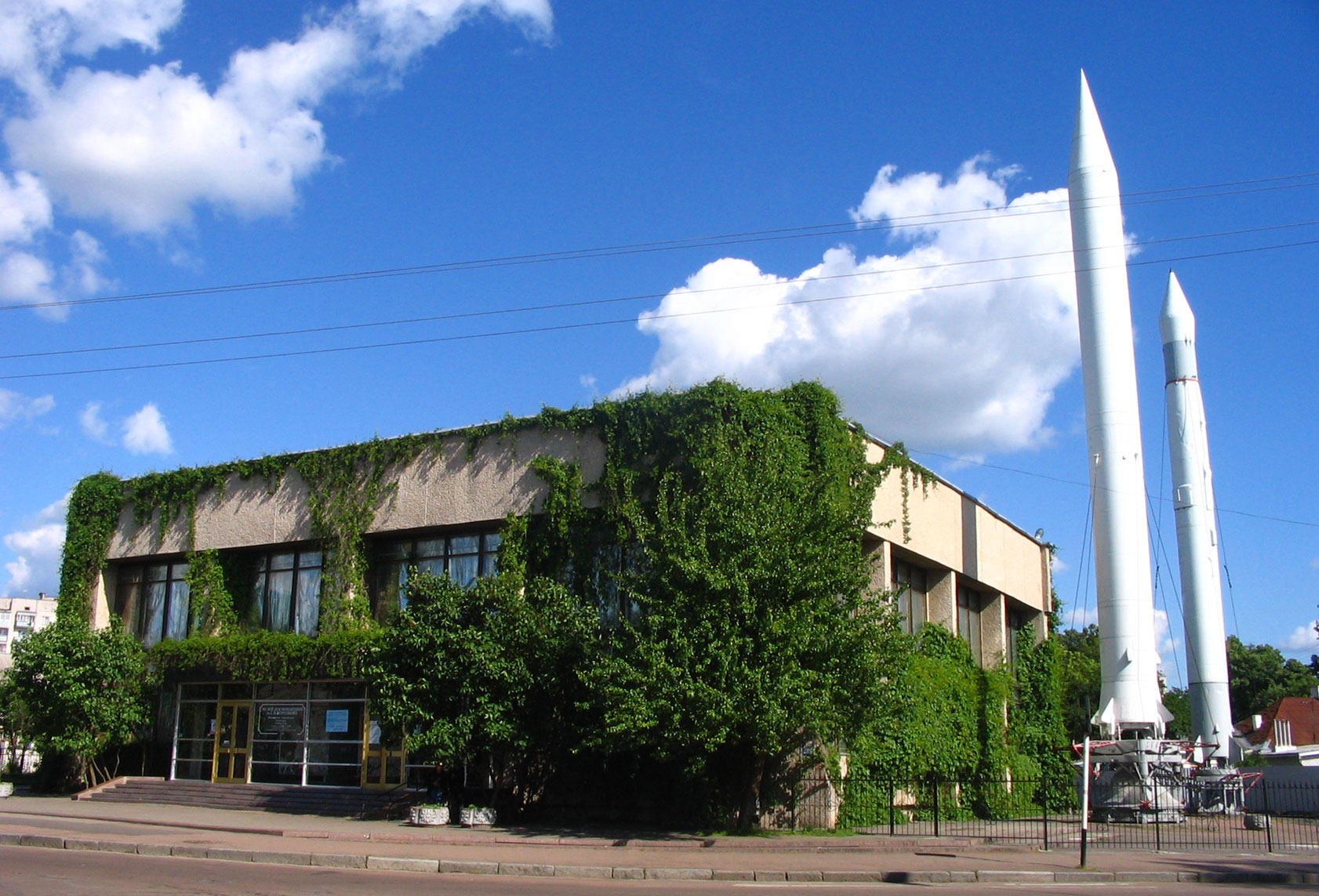
The Korolyov Museum

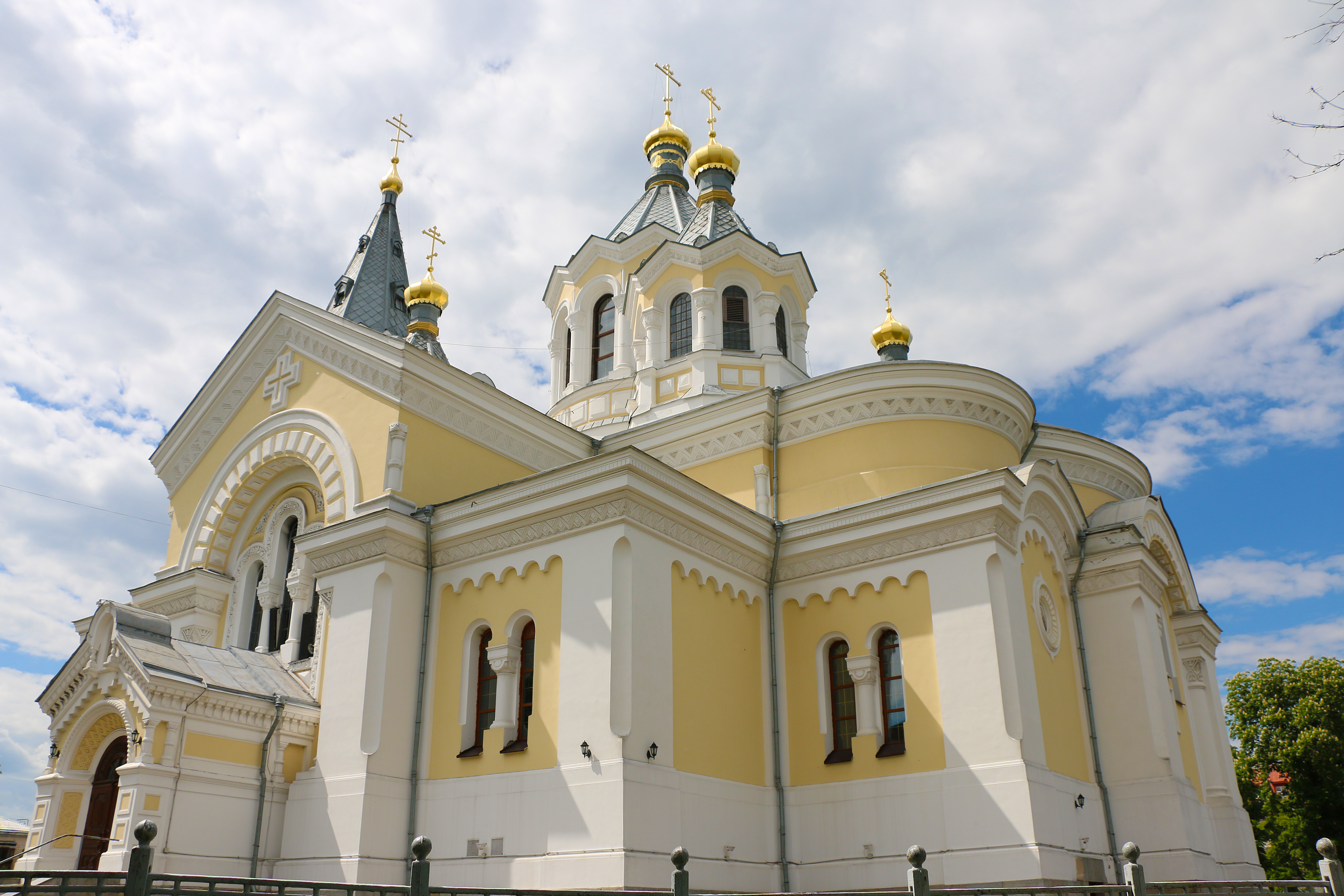
Spaso-Preobrazhenskiy sobor

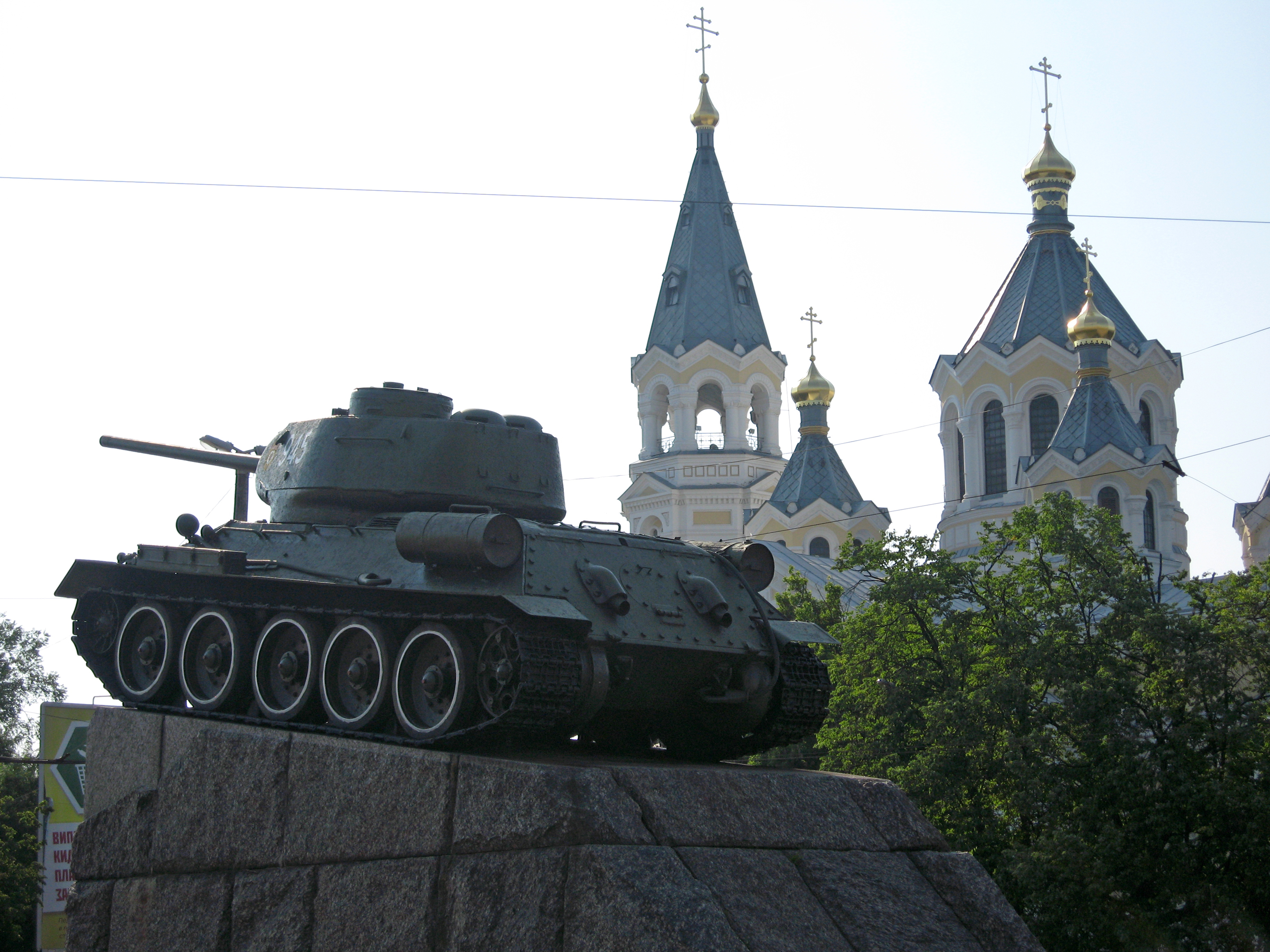
Victory Square with tank monument and Cathedral in Zhytomyr

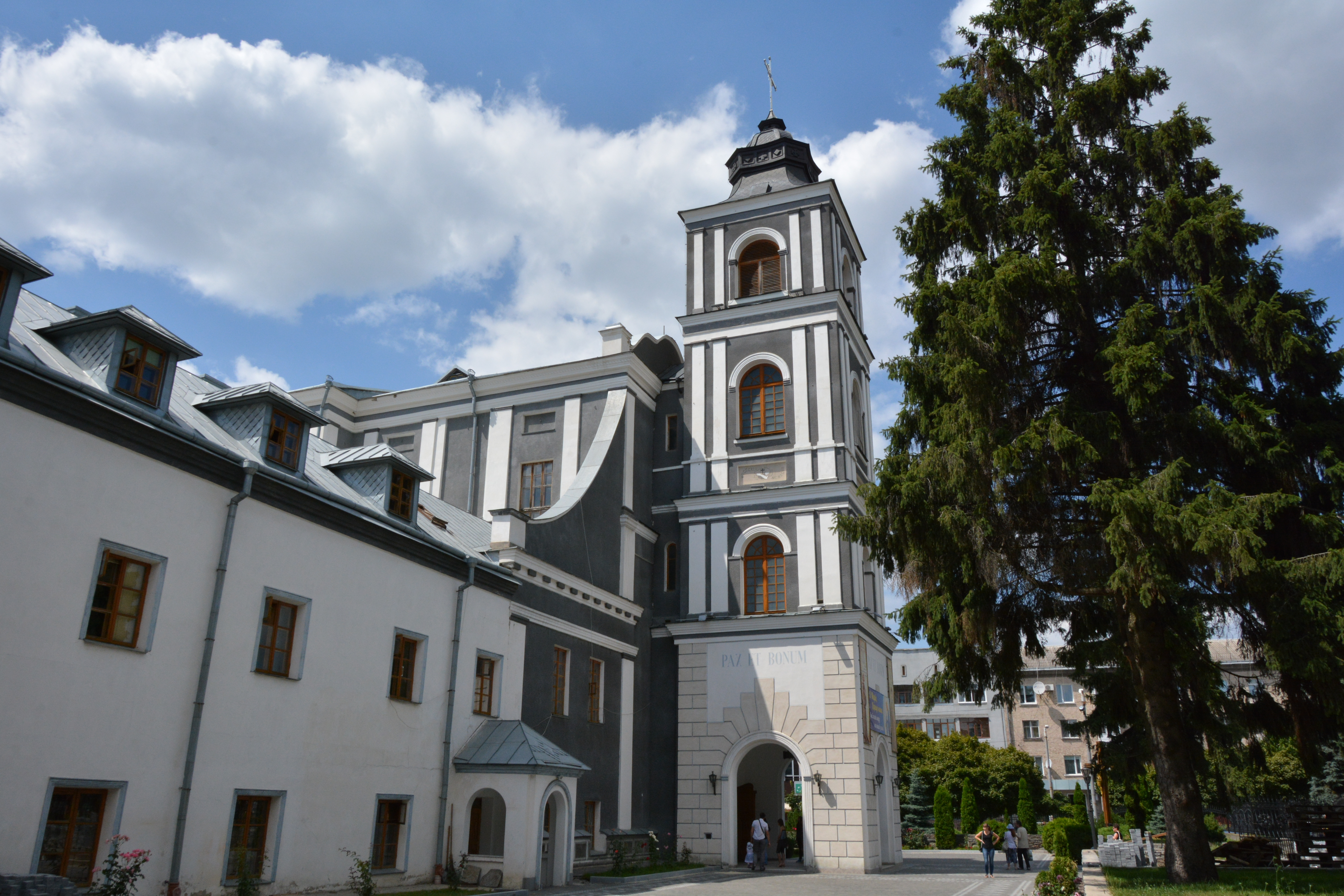
The Catholic Church of St. John in the centre of Zhytomyr

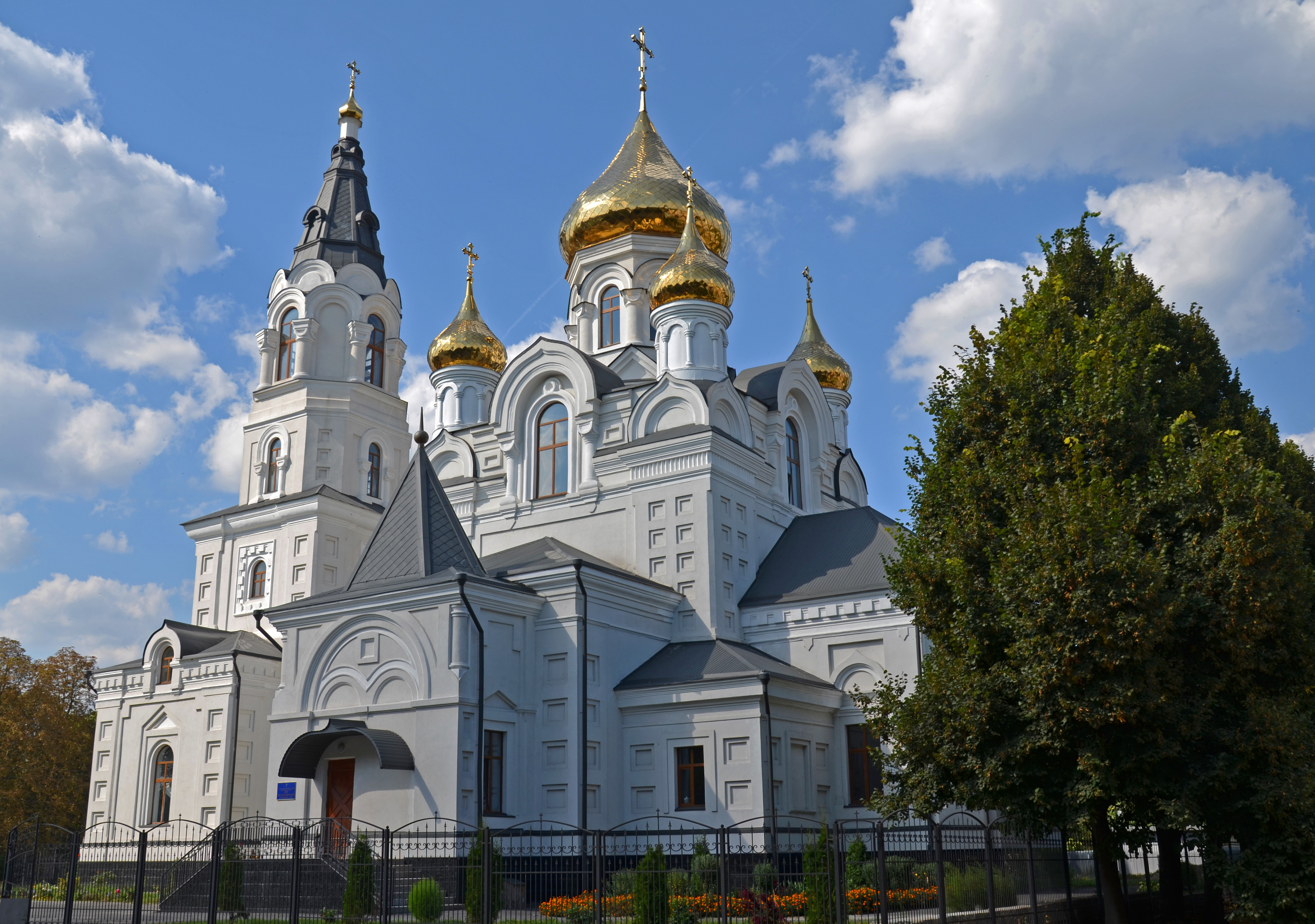
Khrestovozdvizhensky Cathedral

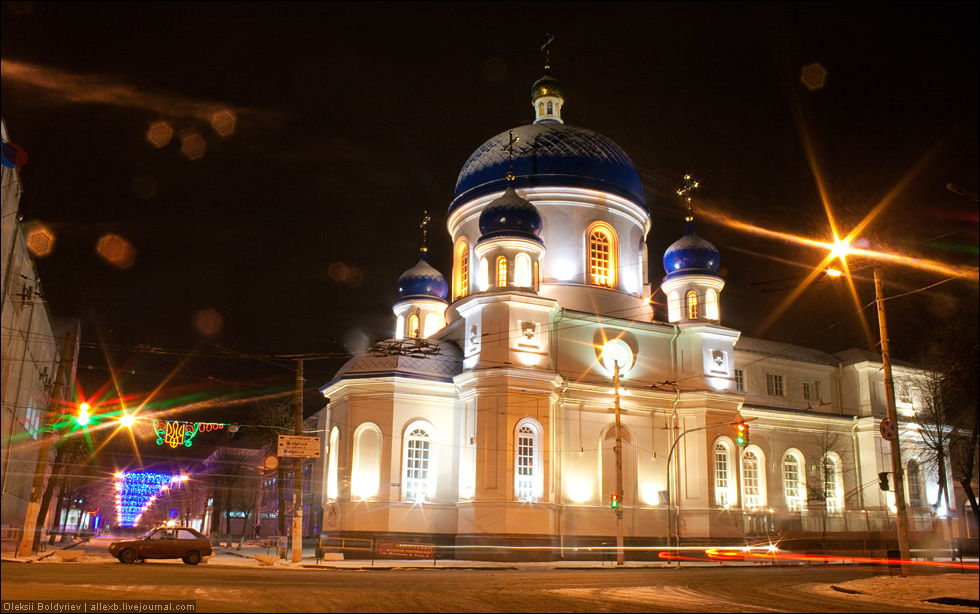
Cathedral, St. Michael's Church

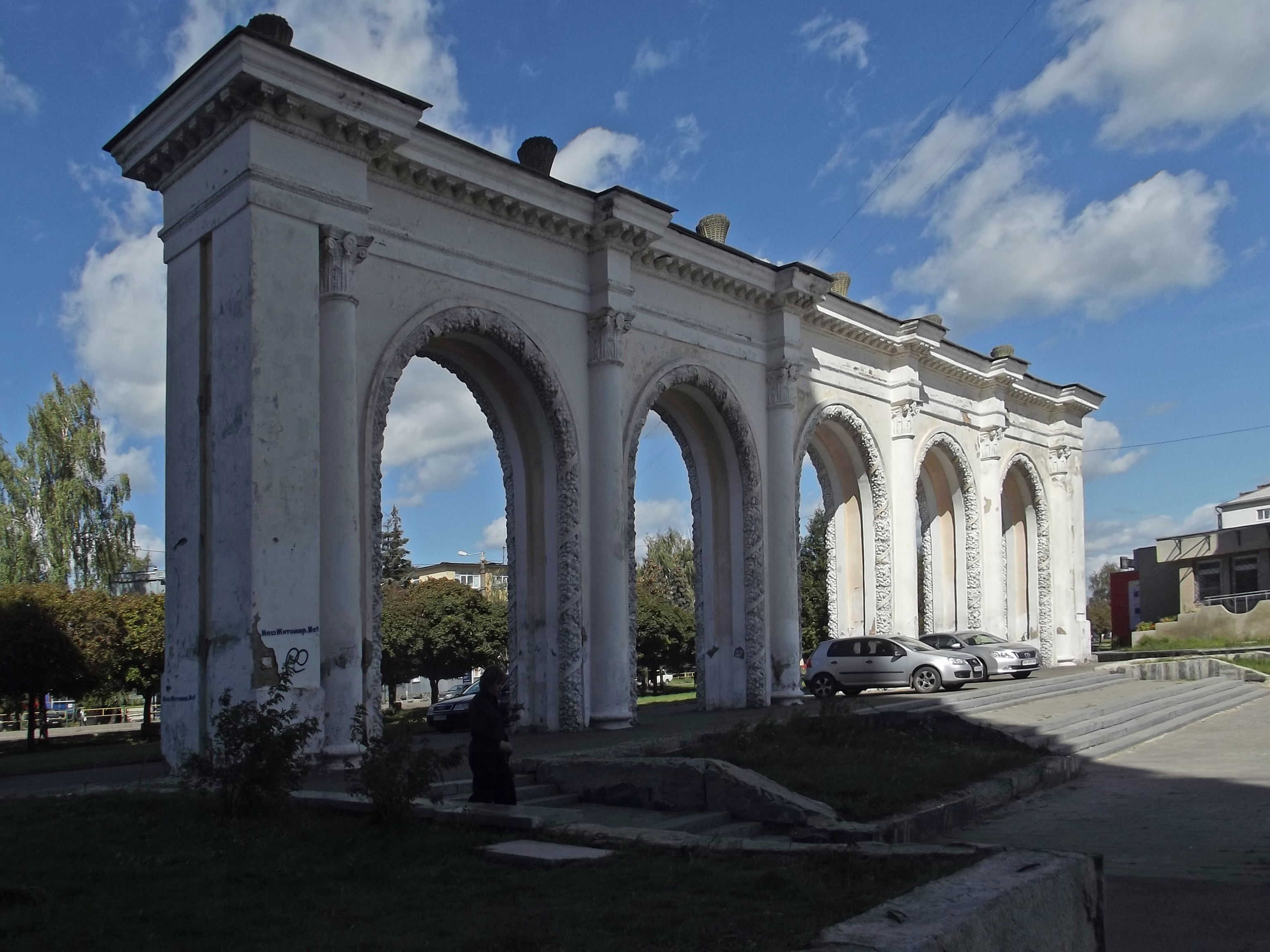
Entrance to the trade fair hall, informal name: "artistic gates"

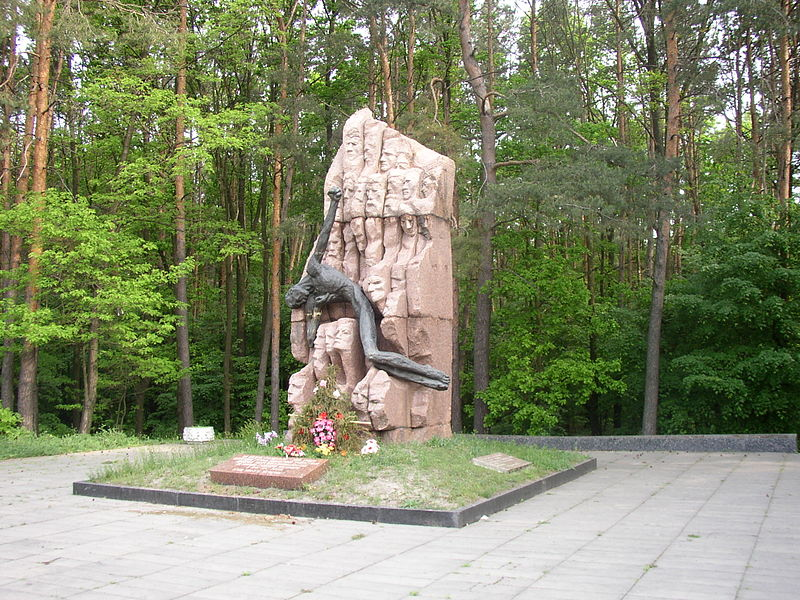
Monument to the victims of fascism (Zhytomyr)

== Sources and external links ==
- "Zhitomir" . Encyclopædia Britannica. Vol. 28 (11th ed.). 1911. p. 979.
- Zhytomyr Journal - news, photo, map and other (in Russian)
- Zhytomyr business directory (in Russian or Ukrainian)
- GCatholic - Latin Catholic bishopric
- interesniy.zhitomir.ua – a blog about history of Zhytomyr (in Russian)
- GCatholic - Latin Catholic cathedral
- Zhytomyr map - cafes, bars, restaurants, everything about the city (in Ukrainian)
- hotels of Zhytomyr
