= Faina Stavskaya =

Belarusian revolutionary (1890–1937)

- Фаіна Стаўская
- Born: 19 November 1890; Antopal, Hrodna, Russian Empire
- Died: 13 July 1937 (aged 46); Moscow, Soviet Union
- Cause of death: Execution by shooting
- Resting place: Donskoye Cemetery
- Political party: Russian Communist Party (1922–1937)
- Other political affiliations: Socialist Revolutionary Party (1917–1922)
- Movement: Revolutionary socialism
- Spouse: Viktor Baranchenko

Faina Efremovna Stavskaya Russian: Фаина Ефремовна Ставская; Belarusian: Фаіна Яфрэмаўна Стаўская; 1890–1937) was a Belarusian revolutionary. Initially involved in the anarchist movement, she carried out propaganda throughout Belarus and attempted to assassinate the governor of Katerynoslav province. She was caught and imprisoned for several years, over time becoming attracted to the principles of revolutionary socialism. Upon her release during the Russian Revolution of 1917, she joined the Socialist Revolutionary Party (PSR) and worked for it in Crimea, Moscow and Ufa. She was charged in the Trial of the Socialist Revolutionaries, but managed to avoid a prison sentence after she agreed to join the Communist Party. She worked in a number of official positions throughout the 1920s and 1930s, becoming the director of the State Public Historical Library of Russia. She was arrested and shot during the Great Purge of 1937.

== Biography ==
=== Early life and activism ===
Faina Efremovna Stavskaya was born on 19 November 1890, in Antopal, in the Grodno Governorate of the Russian Empire. She was raised in a Belarusian Jewish family, which provided her with an education. At a young age, she became interested in the ideas of anarchism and socialism.

In the wake of the Russian Revolution of 1905, she joined an anarchist communist group, for which she carried out revolutionary propaganda in the Belarusian cities of Hrodna, Kobryn, Pruzhany and Białystok. After being arrested in 1907, she moved to Katerynoslav, where she became involved in anarchist terrorism. On 17 May 1908, she unsuccessfully attempted to assassinate governor Alexander Klingenberg by setting off a bomb in the hotel "France", which destroyed the room it was placed in and broke all the hotel's windows. She was arrested on 18 June 1908 and sentenced to 20 years of penal labour, which she served in prisons in Riga, Yaroslavl and Rybinsk. On the occasion of the Romanov Tercentenary, she attempted to petition for amnesty, but was unsuccessful. At this time, she began to develop sympathies for revolutionary socialism and moved away from anarchism.

=== Revolutionary activities ===
Stavskaya was released from prison during the February Revolution of 1917. She went to Petrograd, then to Moscow, before finally moving on to Crimea, where she met her husband Viktor Baranchenko. In September 1917, she joined the Socialist Revolutionary Party (PSR) and began working at the editorial offices for the party's paper Zemlya i Volya. There she became friends with the SR Fanny Kaplan, who would later attempt to assassinate Vladimir Lenin. The three lived together in a boarding house, which they shared with Lenin's brother Dmitry Ulyanov.

In September 1918, she went to Moscow and joined the SR Combat Organization led by Grigory Ivanovich Semyonov. The following month, the party's central committee sent her to Ufa and she continued to work for the central committee until March 1919, when she began organising trade unions in Moscow, for which she was detained for over three months. In November 1919, she joined the central bureau of the PSR's minority faction, serving in the post until August 1920. She was arrested again in December 1921 and, on 24 February 1922, she was charged with anti-Soviet agitation by the GRU. During the Trial of the Socialist Revolutionaries in August 1922, she was sentenced to two years imprisonment, but was granted a release after she agreed to join the Russian Communist Party (RCP) and the Society of Former Political Prisoners and Exiled Settlers (MOPR), on the recommendation of Nikolai Bukharin, Georgy Pyatakov and Leonid Serebryakov.

=== Later life and death ===
In September 1922, she returned to Crimea and settled in Simferopol, where she worked in the RCP's accounting department and as secretary for the local board of the MOPR. In January 1925, she went back to Moscow, where she worked as secretary for student affairs at Vkhutemas. In February 1926, she was appointed as secretary of Main Fuel Administration (Glavtop) and served in this post until January 1930. The following month, she started work as a factory inspector, which she carried out until April 1932. On 1 June 1932, the MOPR granted her a personal pension, but soon renounced it after she found another job in September 1933. From then until 1937, she worked as the director of the State Public Historical Library of Russia.

During the Great Purge, she was arrested on 30 April 1937 and charged with anti-Soviet agitation. On 13 July 1937, was found guilty by the Military Collegium of the Supreme Court of the Soviet Union and sentenced to be shot. Her body was buried in Moscow's Donskoye Cemetery. On 23 April 1957, she was posthumously rehabilitated by the Supreme Soviet of the Soviet Union.
