= Volodarsky District =

Volodarsky District may refer to:

- Volodarsky District, Russia, several districts and city districts in Russia
- Volodarskyi Raion (Volodarsky District), several districts in Ukraine

== See also ==
- Volodarsk (disambiguation)
- Volodarsky (disambiguation)
