= Trial of the Socialist Revolutionaries =

1922 Soviet show trial of anti-Bolshevik leftists

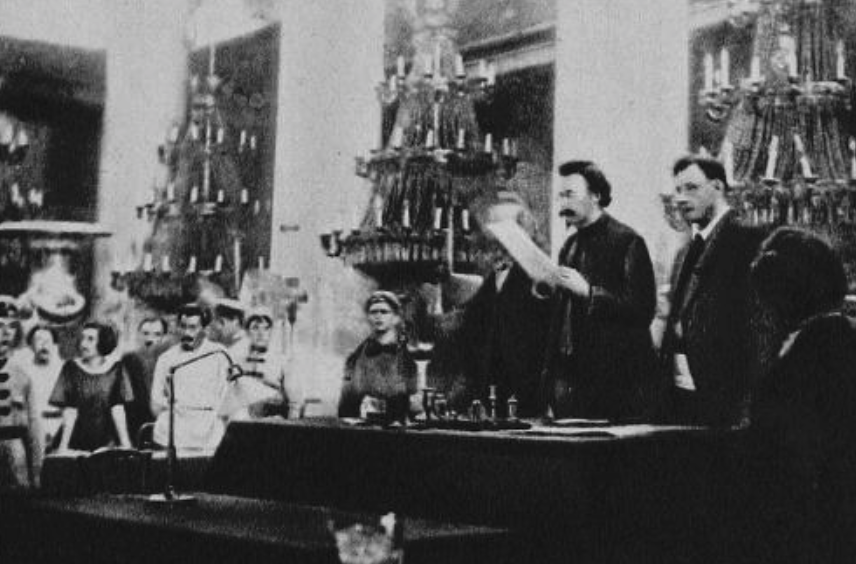
View of the 1922 trial of Socialist Revolutionaries.

The Trial of the Socialist Revolutionaries was an internationally publicized political trial in Soviet Russia, which brought twelve prominent members of the anti-Bolshevik Party of Socialist Revolutionaries (PSR) before the bar. The trial, which took place in Moscow from 8 June to 7 August 1922, was ordered by the Central Committee of the Russian Communist Party.

The Bolshevik Central Committee had confirmed the verdict for the SR defendants to be executed but only on the condition they refused to abandon armed struggles in relation to "conspiratorial, terrorist, and espionage activities". Owing in great measure to international pressure, the death sentences rendered in the trial were subsequently commuted, although none of the defendants would ultimately survive the Great Terror under Stalin during the late 1930s.

== History ==
=== Background: The PSR in the Russian Civil War ===
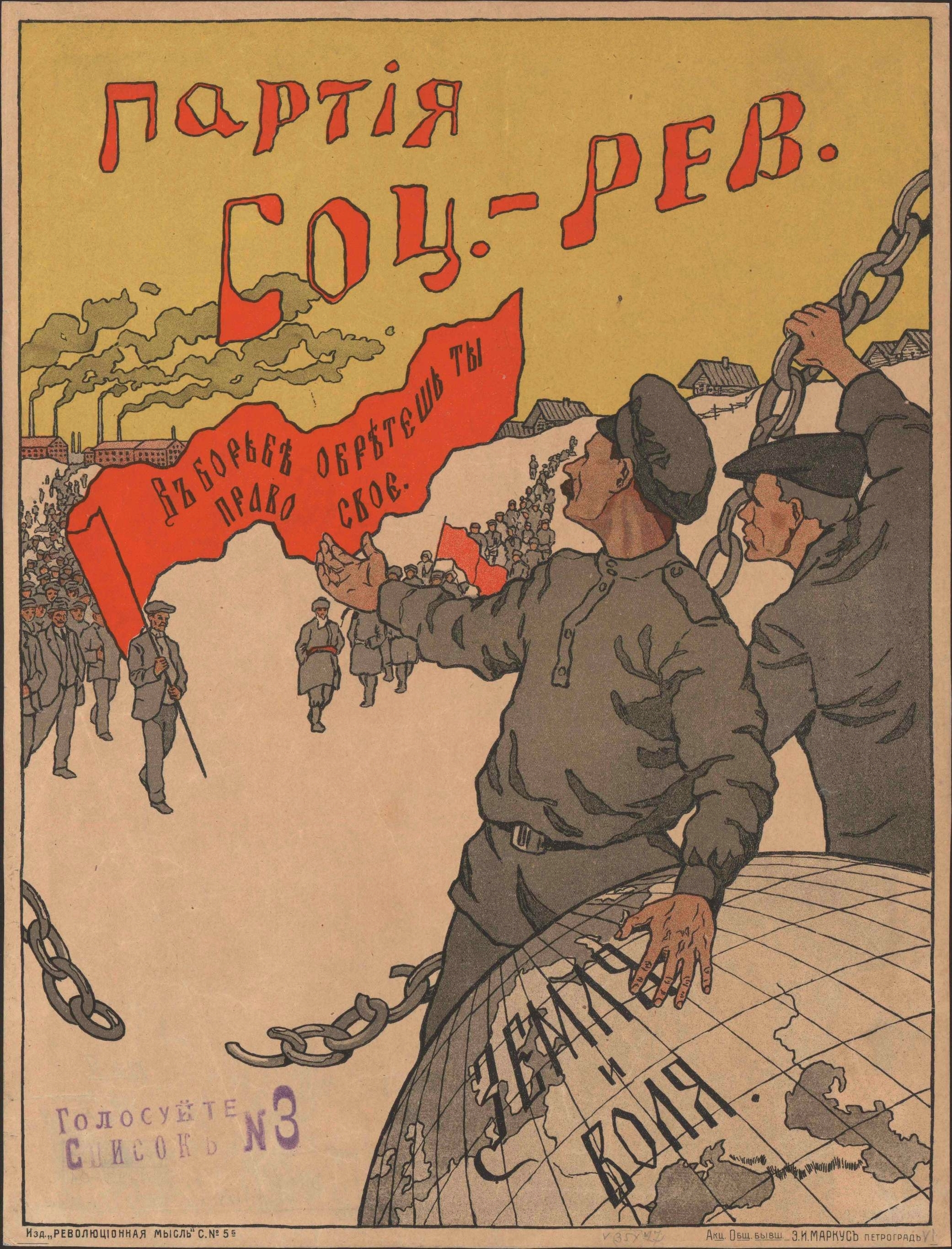
PSR election poster from the 1917 elections for Constituent Assembly.

Following the overthrow of Tsarism in the February Revolution of 1917, the pro-democratic Party of Socialist Revolutionaries (PSR) entered as partners in the Provisional Government headed by Alexander Kerensky. This government remained supportive of the Allied effort in World War I — a position regarded as anathema by radical political organizations, which sought an immediate end to hostilities and institution of a new redistributive government.

On 7 November [O.S. 25 October] 1917, the Russian Social Democratic Labor Party (bolsheviks), supported by a militant faction of the PSR, the Left Socialist Revolutionaries (Left SRs), launched a coup d'état, seizing government power. (Note: The Left SRs would break with the Bolsheviks in March 1918 over acceptance of the Treaty of Brest-Litovsk.) This put the majority of the PSR, retrospectively known as the "Right Socialist Revolutionaries," in direct political conflict with V. I. Lenin and the new Soviet regime, going so far as to attempt to form a counter-government and backing a new uprising in the first days after the revolution, without success.

The Bolshevik government, together with their Left SR allies and a small number of Menshevik-Internationalists, rapidly consolidated power. The PSR placed its hopes upon elections to the Constituent Assembly, a national parliament initially supported by all anti-tsarist parties. In these elections, held in the first days of Bolshevik power, the PSR polled a total of more than 16 million votes — a total which, when combined with the votes cast for similar pro-agrarian parties, amounted to more than half of the 42 million votes cast. The rival Russian Social Democratic Labor Party (bolsheviks), by way of contrast, received a total of just 10 million votes.

Lenin and other Bolshevik leaders had no intention of surrendering power to this new body, however, and the Constituent Assembly was dispersed by force on 5 January 1918, having met only one day. No immediate armed response from the PSR followed, though the organization had previously, like its Narodnik forefathers, engaged in terrorism against the tsarist regime.

In the spring of 1918, the idea of armed struggle against the Bolshevik regime began to spread in party ranks, with a May 1918 conference in Moscow passing a resolution in support of the strategy. The Revolt of the Czechoslovak Legion that same month gave the PSR an opportunity to launch its plan of action and on 8 June a shadow government called the Committee of Members of the Constituent Assembly (Komuch) was launched in the city of Samara, with the declared goal of winning control of the nation in the name of the dispersed Constituent Assembly. With the aid of the Czechoslovak Legion, the Komuch declared war on the Soviet government as well as on Germany, and the Russian Civil War was begun in earnest. The newspapers of the PSR were immediately suppressed.

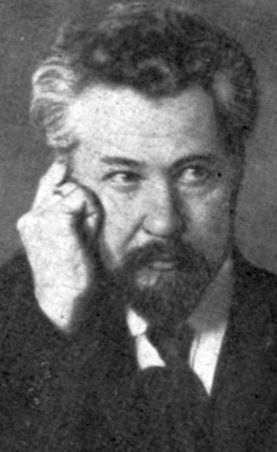
Viktor Chernov, top leader of the PSR, escaped the Soviet secret police by emigrating in 1920.

The Left SRs broke with the Bolsheviks while other regional governments sprang up in opposition to the Soviet regime, contributing to a worsening military situation for the Bolsheviks. Then on 30 August 1918, PSR member Fanny Kaplan fired three shots at Lenin, gravely wounding him, while elsewhere an assassin met with greater success, killing head of the Petrograd Cheka Moisei Uritsky. The Bolsheviks responded with a "Red Terror," taking hostages and engaging in summary executions of their enemies. The bloody civil war, marked by atrocities on both sides, would continue unabated through 1920.

The Cheka (Soviet political police) had begun an active campaign to hunt down members of the governing Central Committee of the PSR late in 1919. Top leader Viktor Chernov went into hiding and stayed ahead of the authorities but was finally forced into emigration in 1920, where he would serve as the PSR's official foreign representative.> Other ranking party figures were not so fortunate, with Dmitrii Donskoi, Sergei Morozov, and Evgeniia Ratner arrested in 1919, and Abram Gots, Evgenii Timofeev, Dmitrii Rakov, and others arrested in early 1920. By the middle of 1921, all members of the Central Committee who had not emigrated were in Cheka custody, with the secret police continuing to arrest all known party members who could be located. A new five member Central Bureau was named to guide the shattered party, but it too was decimated by arrests.

Facing the threat of Monarchist military dictatorship on the one hand and the Bolsheviks on the other, the PSR attenuated its campaign against the Bolsheviks in the second half of 1920, with party leaders passing a resolution on 1 October 1920, which ruled out further armed resistance to the Bolsheviks in the near future. The shattered party was deemed to have insufficient forces to have a credible chance at overthrowing the Bolshevik regime and sought not to play into the hands of those seeking a right wing restoration and therefore ceased to fight, going so far as to denounce the Tambov Rebellion of 1921 as a "semi-banditry movement."

The PSR, crushed to the point of near total disruption, played virtually no role in the requisitions-related peasant revolts of 1920 and 1921, contentions of the secret police notwithstanding.

=== Preparations for the trial ===
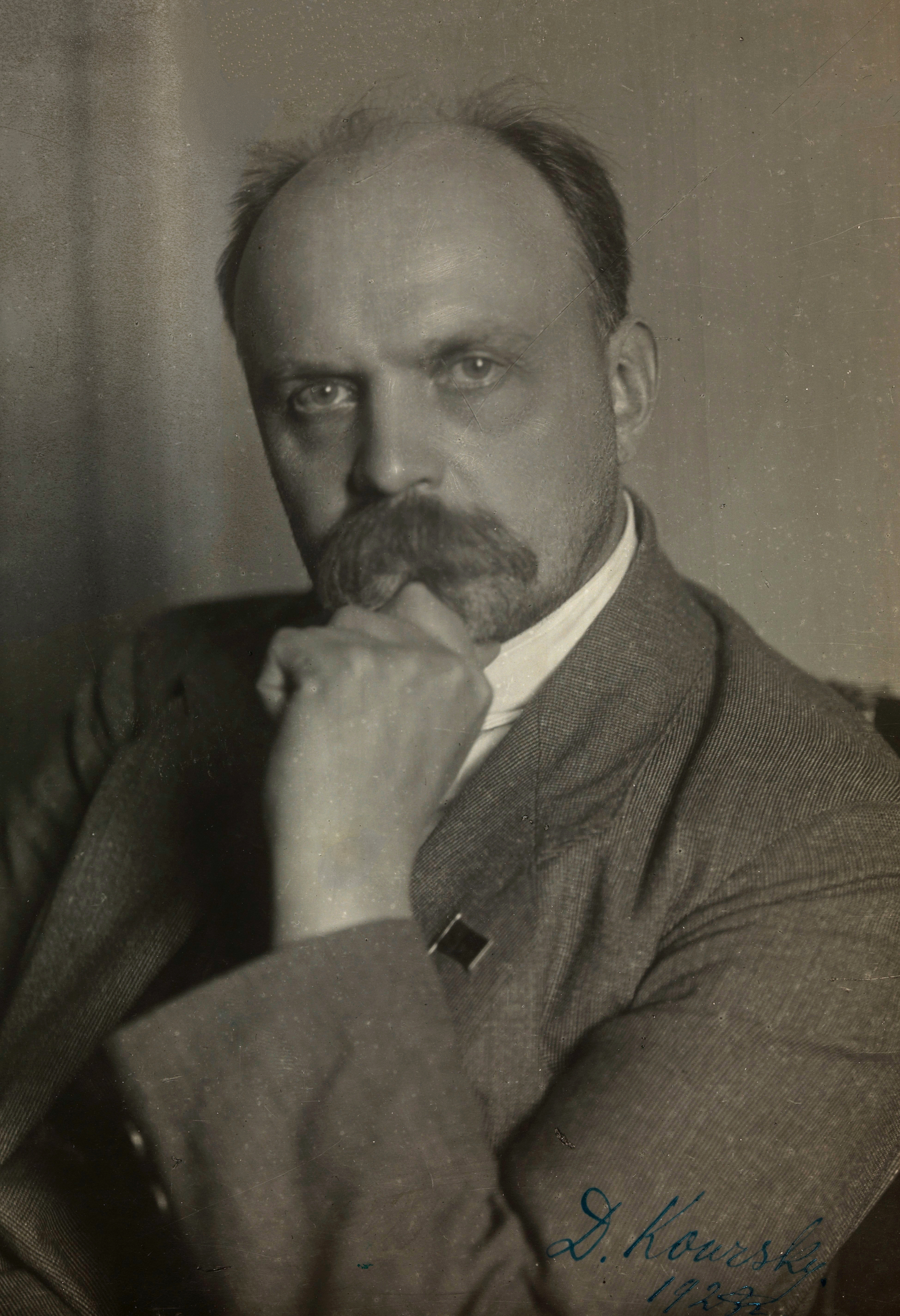
People's Commissar of Justice Dmitry Kursky, head of the Soviet legal administration during the 1922 trial of the PSR leaders.

In 1921, in an effort to restore the shattered economy, Lenin and the Soviet government embarked on a program of economic liberalization known as the New Economic Policy (NEP). This critical change meant abandonment of the old force-based system of commodity acquisition and the ration-based system of product distribution, in favor of a restoration of stable currency and the use of markets — a change which involved the delegation of greater power to the producing peasantry. With the political position of the Bolshevik regime commensurately weakened, the Soviet government intensified its effort to suppress and eliminate all political opposition within the country.

On 28 December 1921, the Central Committee of the Russian Communist Party (bolsheviks) [RKP(b)] secretly voted to organize a public trial of the Central Committee of the PSR, with a three-member commission consisting of party leaders Lev Kamenev and Joseph Stalin and Cheka head Felix Dzerzhinsky appointed to determine the timing of the public announcement of this controversial decision. There would be an interval of two months before this official announcement was made.

Lenin himself defined the Communist Party's objective in the trial of their opponents with a Feb. 20, 1922 letter to People's Commissar of Justice Dmitrii Kurskii, sent one week before public announcement of the trial. Lenin called for:

"intensification of the repression of the political enemies of the Soviet regime and the agents of the bourgeoisie (in particular the Mensheviks and the Socialist Revolutionaries); the use of such repression by Revolutionary Tribunals and People's Courts in the quickest and, for the revolution, most effective manner; the compulsory organization of a number of model trials (which will stand model as regards the explanation of their significance to the masses of the people by the court and in the press) in Moscow, Petrograd, Kharkov, and other major centers;... — all this must be taken in hand systematically, resolutely, and with determination.

This internal document was rewritten by lawyer Iakov Brandenburgskii for public dissemination and published in Pravda on 23 March, emphasizing that the trials be structured and publicized in such a way that the workers and peasants of the country should not only hear about them but understand their underlying political message. In short, historian Marc Jansen has observed, "the trial of the Socialist Revolutionaries was intended not to bring the truth to light but to arouse public opinion against the Socialist Revolutionaries."

During the night of 24/25 February 1922, the members of the Central Committee of the PSR were moved from their cells in Butyrka prison to the so-called "Inner Prison" located at secret police headquarters on Lubyanka Square in Moscow, where they were confined in strict isolation.

Certain that a repressive trial with preordained grim results was in the offing, the official representatives of the PSR abroad, organized as a body called the Foreign Delegation of the PSR, began an international publicity campaign in support of their imprisoned comrades. On 7 March members of the PSR gathered in Berlin to form an international committee against the trial, leading to an official appeal of the Foreign Delegation of the PSR to all socialist parties in the world two days later. This came at a time when the Communist International (Comintern) was closely pursuing sensitive united front negotiations with the two international federations of non-communist socialist parties — the remnant of the Second International and their more radical counterparts in the short-lived so-called Vienna International. (Note: The Second and Two-and-a-Half internationals would reunite as the Labour and Socialist International in 1923.) The Soviet regime was thus in a position in which it was particularly sensitive to radical criticism.

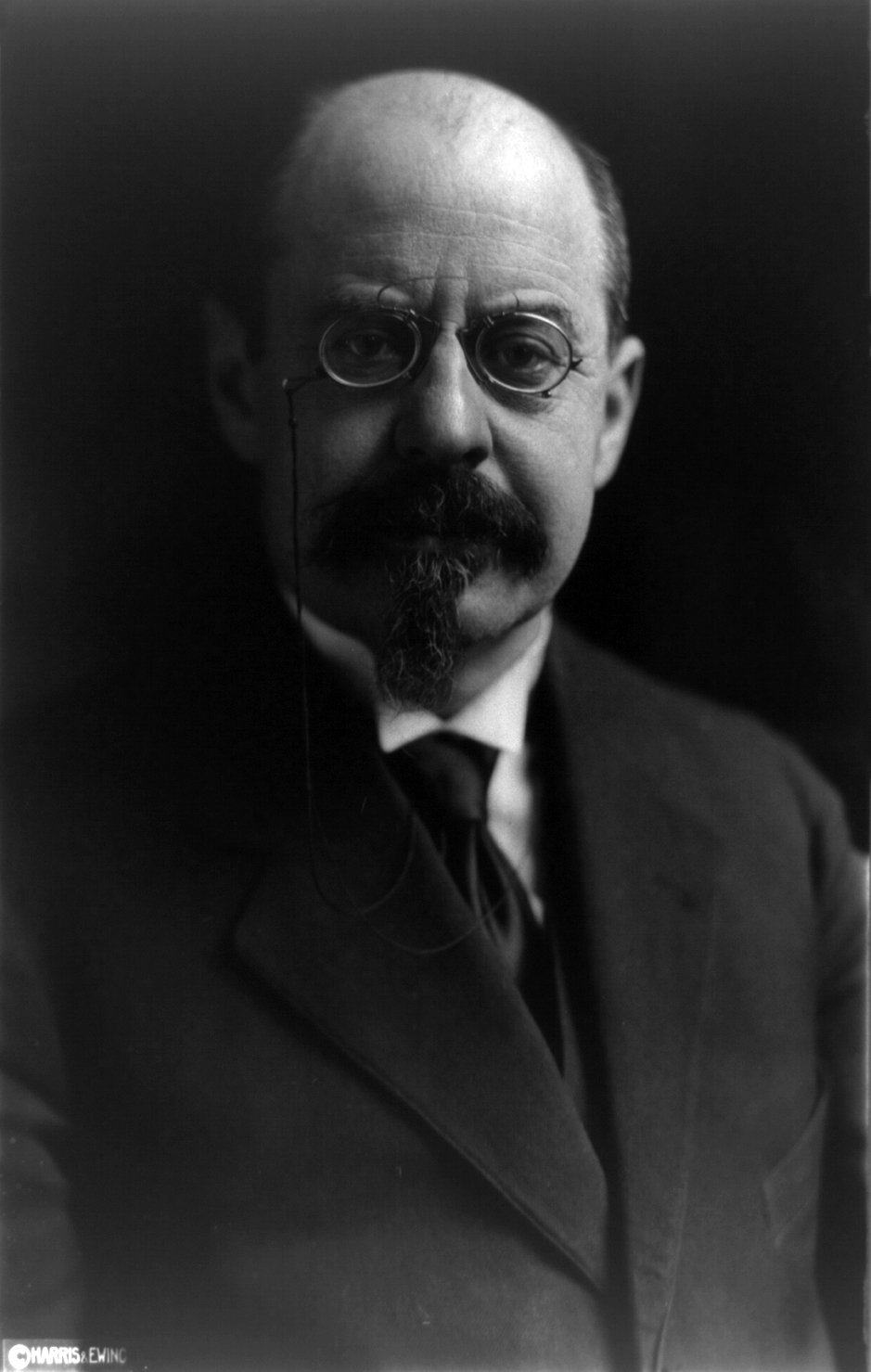
Belgian social democratic leader Émile Vandervelde was admitted to the trial as a defense attorney for the Socialist Revolutionary defendants.

The 9 March appeal of the Foreign Delegation of the PSR was met with a wave of support from the various political organizations of the non-communist left. The Second International was virtually universal in its condemnation of a show trial as an opaque attempt to stifle socialist dissent in Russia, which the parties and leaders of the Vienna International distance themselves from the armed struggle of the PSR against the Soviet government, while seeking a fair trial and the opportunity for unfettered international investigation of the question of PSR participation in counterrevolutionary crimes.

In an effort to explore the possibility of unity of action, the three Internationals met at the Conference of the Three Internationals, held in Berlin from 2–5 April 1922. The forthcoming trial of the PSR leadership was inserted as a substantial issue in these negotiations, with representatives of the Second International, a delegation headed by Émile Vandervelde and Ramsay MacDonald, demanding the guarantee of the defendants to a competent independent defense and the right of the Internationals to directly supervise the trial. On behalf of the Bolsheviks, chief negotiator Karl Radek refused the demand for external supervisory authority, but agreed in principle with the suggestion that Vandervelde serve as a counsel for the defense and further guaranteed that representatives of the Second and Vienna Internationals should have the right to attend the trial, study documents of the case, and take stenographic report of the proceedings.

In an effort to calm waters with the Western socialists, Comintern delegates made additional broad guarantees, which included the right of all counsels chosen by the defendants to be admitted, a promise that the trial would be held in public, and a guarantee that no death penalties would be imposed. Nikolai Bukharin and V.I. Lenin were sharply critical of these allowances made to the socialist critics abroad, with Lenin giving voice to his objections with an article entitled "We Have Paid Too High a Price," published in both Pravda and Izvestiia on 11 April. Nevertheless, Lenin concluded, the agreement, having been made, should not now be broken.

These concessions made to the Western socialist parties were ratified on 19 April by a resolution of the Executive Committee of the Communist International (ECCI) — an action which had binding authority upon the Russian Communist Party. A list of ten counsels was prepared by the Western socialists, including Vandervelde, Giuseppe Modigliani of the Italian Socialist Party, Theodor Liebknecht (older brother of German Communist martyr Karl Liebknecht), and three members of the Party of Socialist Revolutionaries in exile. This list of ten was accepted by the Comintern early in May but suffered attrition when the three SRs and several others dropping out for assorted reasons. Ultimately only four of these would make their way to Moscow in May — Vandervelde and Belgian socialist Arthur Wauters of the Second International and Liebknecht and German radical Kurt Rosenfeld of the Vienna International.

=== The charges ===
Prior to 1 April 1922, investigation of the PSR leadership was conducted by the Cheka and its institutional successor, the State Political Directorate (Russian: Государственное политическое управление, GPU). This investigation was headed by Iakov Agranov, a top leader of the secret police establishment, who hand-selected potential witnesses from the scores of PSR members that had been arrested and detained over the course of 1921 and the first months of 1922.

After 1 April, the investigation was taken over by Nikolai Krylenko, chair of the Revolutionary Tribunal of the All-Russian Central Executive Committee and member of the Collegium of Prosecutors. Agranov and Krilenko worked to build up a circle of past and present party members who could provide damaging statements to implicate the PSR's top leadership in criminal activity; the top leaders themselves did not aid the preliminary investigation. It was only on 23 May, the day on which the preliminary investigation came to an end, that the isolated subjects of the inquiry were informed as to the charges against them. The trial was slated to begin barely more than one week later, on 1 June, allowing precious little time for preparation of a defense.

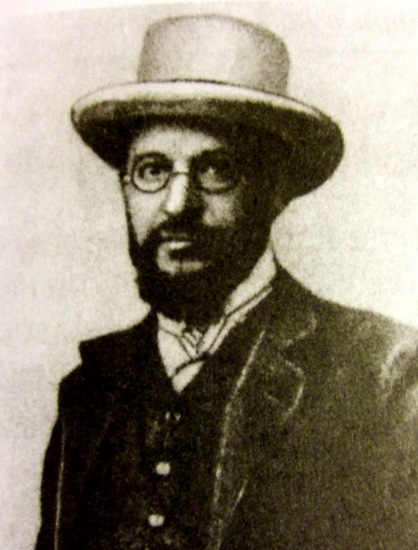
Abram Gots was the best-known of the 12 defendants in the 1922 trial.

The indictment in the so-called "Affair of the Central Committee and of Certain Members of Other Organizations of the PSR" was a weighty document, running to 117 pages. Allegations included the conduct of armed struggle against the Soviet state, having organized murderous terrorist actions and raids, and having committed treason through contract with hostile foreign powers. The PSR was held to be largely responsible for several peasant uprisings which erupted in 1920, including revolts in Tambov province, Siberia, and the Black Sea region, and with having been in communication with mutinous sailors involved in the Kronstadt rebellion.

In addition to 12 members of the Central Committee and 10 active members of the PSR held in custody, the indictment also formally named others deemed culpable who would not appear as defendants at the bar; these included not only SRs in emigration such as Viktor Chernov, but also leading Mensheviks such as Julius Martov, Fyodor Dan, and Raphael Abramovitch, as well as leading members of other political organizations. The indictment was as much a political pamphlet as it was a legal document, with some 4,000 copies printed for internal and international distribution.

The defendants were charged with having violated a new Penal Code which went into effect only on 1 June 1922 — that is, after the alleged counterrevolutionary crimes had been committed. Rather than a devious use of ex post facto law, a scholar specializing in Soviet show trials contends that the 1922 PSR trial's adherence to the new legal code was intended to demonstrate to the world instead the abandonment of ad hoc revolutionary legality in favor of the norms of traditional codified legality.

After arriving in Moscow on 25 May — greeted at the train station by a hostile demonstration of thousands — the four foreign counsels were allowed to meet the 22 potential defendants in prison almost daily to prepare a defense. Abram Gots served as the principal spokesman for the jailed SRs, who challenged the authority of the Bolsheviks to try them and who sought to pursue an aggressive political indictment of their own of the Soviet regime in public trial. This marked a return to the common tactic of revolutionary defendants embroiled in the courts of the tsar, who sought to undermine the ruling order in court before the eyes of the world.

In addition to the high-profile Western defenders, a set of Russian defenders were provided the defendants. These both political leaders such as Nikolai Bukharin and Mikhail Tomsky as well Bolshevik jurists. A total of ten state defenders were provided.

The Supreme Tribunal also approved a set of three public prosecutors. These included Nikolai Krylenko, the erudite Anatoly Lunacharsky, and historian Mikhail Pokrovsky. Of this team, Krylenko fulfilled the role of true public prosecutor. The Comintern also designated several international Communist leaders as members of the prosecution. These included Clara Zetkin of Germany, Alois Muna of Czechoslovakia, and Dezső Bokányi of Hungary. Ludovic-Oscar Frossard of France and Bohumír Šmeral were additionally named by ECCI as prosecution "political experts" and potential trial witnesses.

Forces were thus arrayed for a great political trial.

=== First phase of the trial ===
Soviet newsreel depicting leading figures and the reading of the indictment in the 1922 Trial of the SRs. (Video)

The sensational Trial of the Socialist Revolutionaries began 8 June 1922 in the Pillar Hall of the House of the Unions in Moscow, a former ballroom created for use of the prerevolutionary nobility. The three judges of the court, headed by future Great Purge victim Iurii Piatakov, sat on a slightly elevated platform at one end of the great hall beneath a large red banner of a worker wielding an anvil before a red, rising sun, with the words "Workers of the World, Unite!" The hall, which could seat about 1,500 spectators was heavily guarded by armed soldiers.

The court met six times a week, with a first session running from noon until 5:00 pm and an evening session convening at 7:00 pm and continuing until about midnight. Two groups of defendants were subject to trial, a group of 22 rank-and-file members of the PSR to serve as de facto witnesses for the prosecution in addition to the 12 members of the organization's Central Committee. The 22 rank-and-filers were removed from the courtroom to prison custody when they were not actively testifying.

Several days were spent fighting over procedure, with the PSR leaders and their Western defenders indicating that the court did not meet the criteria of impartiality agreed upon by the Comintern and the two Socialist internationals. In addition to the Communist Party membership of all three judges, the defense objected to the packing of the audience with Bolshevik partisans — very few admission tickets having been made available for distribution to friends of the defendants.

The defense also objected to a prior ruling that four prominent Mensheviks should not be allowed as defense attorneys. Every request of the defense was ultimately defeated. In addition, the defense was frequently prohibited from speaking when desired and was subjected to a steady avalanche of jeering and attempts at intimidation by the public spectators.

During the trial two ex-members of the Party of Socialist Revolutionaries, G.I. Semenov and L.V. Konopleva, testified that the Central Committee of the PSR had coordinated an armed struggle against the Soviet state and directed the assassination of Lenin and V. Volodarsky, the latter of whom was actually murdered on 20 June 1918. Semenov had joined the Bolsheviks in 1919, and thereafter became an agent provocateur.

The defendants proclaimed their innocence based upon a general amnesty which had been granted to the PSR by the Soviet government in February 1919 and a claim that charges under the new legal code of 1922 were a clear and obvious case of use of an ex post facto law, thus representing a violation of a basic tenet of legality. Both of these fundamental arguments of the defense were speedily rejected by the court.

On 14 June the defendants met with their Western defenders and determined that they should no longer provide validation for the Soviet "parody of justice" through their presence at the sessions. The Western defenders accordingly boycotted the afternoon session, meeting at night with the SR defendants to draft a public statement, which argued that the Berlin Agreement between the three Internationals had been pointedly violated to the point of having been invalidated.

The Western defenders attempted to leave Russia forthwith to continue their efforts on behalf of the SR defendants in the court of public opinion. Soviet authorities attempted to block this effort by denying the socialists exit visas, however. It was only on 19 June, following a 24-hour hunger strike, that the Western socialists were granted departure documents and allowed to leave Soviet Russia.

=== Mass demonstration of 20 June ===
Anti-PSR marchers on Red Square bearing a dancing placard of Émile Vandervelde, 20 June 1922.

On 20 June 1922, in commemoration of the fourth anniversary of the assassination of Volodarsky by an SR assassin, a mass demonstration was organized in Moscow. A massive throng estimated variously at from 150,000 to 300,000 people marched through Red Square, led by members of the Soviet court. A crowd gathered outside the House of the Trade Unions and were addressed by a number of government officials and representatives of workers' committees.

The afternoon session of 20 June was brought to an early close due to the demonstration, and members of the court and the prosecution — including President of the Tribunal Piatakov, Prosecutor Krylenko and Zetkin, ostensible defenders of the SR rank-and-filers Nikolai Bukharin and Jacques Sadoul, and an array of prominent international Communists participated in the march and speeches. Banners were wielded by marchers demanding "Death to the traitors of the revolution!" "Death to the Social Democrats!" and other inflammatory slogans.

Speaking from the platform to the assembled crowd, Piatakov promised the demonstrators that the court would defend "the interests and the peace of the working class" and deliver punishment to counterrevolutionaries which was "righteous and severe." Krylenko urged the crowd to support a judgement of the death penalty for the defendants. Orators gathered at various points on Red Square delivered similar messages to the congregating marchers.

Despite the grimness of the general slogans, marchers included a great number of women and children and the mood of the crowd was not violent; rather, a holiday spirit seems to have prevailed. One popular placard was a large cutout of Émile Vandervelde with string-operated arms and legs, which gesticulated wildly in time to the martial music being played by a marching band. The placard bore the slogan, "Vandervelde, dancer for the king."

Following the demonstration the court held an evening session. Chief judge Piatakov allowed two delegations representing "the proletariat of Moscow and Petrograd" to appear before the court, where for two and a half hours they delivered a series of denunciations of the defendants, calling them killers and enemies of the working class and urging administration of the death penalty as righteous retribution.

=== Second phase of the trial ===
Chief defense attorney N.K. Muraviev was extremely critical of the hyperpoliticization of the trial represented by the orchestrated 20 June demonstration and permission of the court to allow the avalanche of denunciation. He asserted on 22 June that such actions had "completely infringed upon the existing legal framework on which we depend." Muraviev called for the tribunal to be dissolved, declaring, "Woe to the country, woe to the people, who show contempt of the law and who mock those who defend the law." This demand was summarily rejected by Piatakov and the tribunal, which emphasized its "revolutionary conception of proletarian law."

This provoked another dramatic withdrawal from the case by the defense on 23 June, accompanied by a declaration that it was impossible to carry out a proper legal defense given the structure of the proceedings crafted by the court. Prosecutor Krylenko objected strenuously to the mass resignation of defense counsel, asserting that it was a "public law obligation" for these attorneys to stay on the case. Krylenko called for a complaint to be filed with the Moscow Soviet, governing authority of the College of Advocates, with a view to disbarring these striking defense attorneys from the further practice of law.

Under threat of a complaint to the People's Commissariat of Justice, for two days an attempt was made to get the defense attorneys to reconsider their decision to withdraw. A requirement was made that each defense attorney and every defendant must resign their task or renounce the representation of their attorney's services. This was achieved and at the evening session of 26 June the trial ground to a halt due to departure of the defense. Piatakov announced that the defense was effectively relieved of their duties and notice served to the Commissariat of Justice that new legal representation would be henceforth required. Muraviev and two other leading attorneys were said to have been subsequently arrested as a result of these actions.

Testimony before the court was stacked, with some 58 witnesses were called for the prosecution. The defense sought to call 40 witnesses on its behalf, many of whom were PSR members sitting in jail. Of these, 20 potential witnesses were immediately rejected by the court and a total of only nine were ultimately allowed to present potentially exculpatory evidence. Prosecution witnesses included not only those PSR members on trial with the 12 Central Committee defendants but also a group of another 19 former party members who had been arrested prior to the great trial and threatened with their own trial and sentencing unless evidence useful to the prosecution's case was presented.

=== Verdict ===
The trial concluded with death sentences for the 12, and acquittal for those who gave evidence. Upon further review by the tribunal, the death sentences were commuted.

=== International reaction ===
The trial of the Socialist Revolutionaries quickly became a cause célèbre among non-Bolshevik radicals in the West. Marxist theoretician Karl Kautsky — a bitter opponent of the Bolsheviks from the earliest days of the October Revolution — minced no words in his denunciation:

"The Bolsheviki were first to use violence against other socialists. They dissolved the Constituent Assembly not by way of resistance against any violence on the part of the Socialists-Revolutionists and the Mensheviki, but because of their realization of their own inability to obtain the support of a majority of the peasants and workers by means of free propaganda. This was the fundamental cause of the Bolshevist coup d'etat against the representatives of the revolutionary workers and peasants. Hence, the abolition of all rights of all other socialists who refused to submit to the crack of the Bolshevist whip. Hence, the establishment of a political regime which leaves but one form of open political action for the opposition — civil war.... The real crime of which the Socialists-Revolutionists are guilty before the Bolsheviki at the present moment is not in the preparation of terroristic acts and armed uprisings, but in that...[they] are acquiring in ever increasing measure the confidence of the toiling masses of Russia. This bids fair to bring about the complete isolation of the Bolsheviki in a short time..."

=== Results and legacy ===
All of the defendants and participants in the trial would eventually become victims in Stalin's purges.

== Defendants ==
- Vladimir Vladimirovich Agapov
- Arkadii Ivanovich Altovskii
- Dmitrii Dmitrievich Donskoi
- Mikhail Iakovlevich Gendelman
- Abram Rafailovich Gots
- Lev Iakovlevich Gershtein
- Nikolai Nikolaevich Ivanov
- Elena Aleksandrovna Ivanova-Iranova
- Mikhail Aleksandrovich Likhach
- Sergei Vladimirovich Morozov
- Evgeniia Moiseevna Ratner-Elkind
- Evgenii Mikhailovich Timofeev

== See also ==
- List of show trials in the Soviet Union
- Moscow Show Trials of the 1930s
- Second Moscow Trial

== Bibliography ==
- Cassiday, Julie A. (2000). The Enemy on Trial: Early Soviet Courts on Stage and Screen. DeKalb, IL: Northern Illinois University Press. ISBN 0-87580-266-4.
- Jansen, Marc (1982). A Show Trial Under Lenin: The Trial of the Socialist Revolutionaries, Moscow 1922. The Hague: Martinus Nijhoff Publishers. ISBN 978-94-009-7606-1.
