= Volodarsky District, Russia =

Location of Astrakhan Oblast in Russia

Location of Nizhny Novgorod Oblast in Russia

Volodarsky District is the name of several administrative and municipal districts in Russia. The districts are generally named after V. Volodarsky, a Russian revolutionary and politician.

== Districts of the federal subjects ==
- Volodarsky District, Astrakhan Oblast, an administrative and municipal district of Astrakhan Oblast
- Volodarsky District, Nizhny Novgorod Oblast, an administrative and municipal district of Nizhny Novgorod Oblast

== City divisions ==
- Volodarsky City District, a city district of Bryansk, the administrative center of Bryansk Oblast
Location of Bryansk in Russia

== See also ==
- Volodarsky (disambiguation)
- Volodarsk (disambiguation)
