= Grigory Semyonov =

Grigory Semyonov may refer to:

- Grigory Ivanovich Semyonov, Socialist Revolutionary who became a Bolshevik chekist
- Grigory Semyonov (general), commander of the White Army, an ataman

== See also ==
- Semyonov (disambiguation)
