= Volodarsky =

Volodarsky (masculine), Volodarskaya (feminine), or Volodarskoye (neuter) may refer to:

- Volodarsky (surname)

Places

- Volodarsky District, name of several districts in the countries of the former Soviet Union
- Volodarsky (rural locality) (Volodarskaya, Volodarskoye), name of several rural localities in Russia
- Saumalkol (North Kazakhstan), formerly Volodarskoye

Other

- Steamer Volodarskiy, a Russian ship which was active in the Arctic during the 1930s
- Volodarsky (Murmansk Shipping Company), a ship used for nuclear waste hauling and storage
- Volodarsky Bridge, bridge across the Neva River in St. Petersburg, Russia

== See also ==
- Volodarsk (disambiguation)
