= Fanny Kaplan =

Attempted assassin of Vladimir Lenin (1890–1918)

- Фанни Каплан
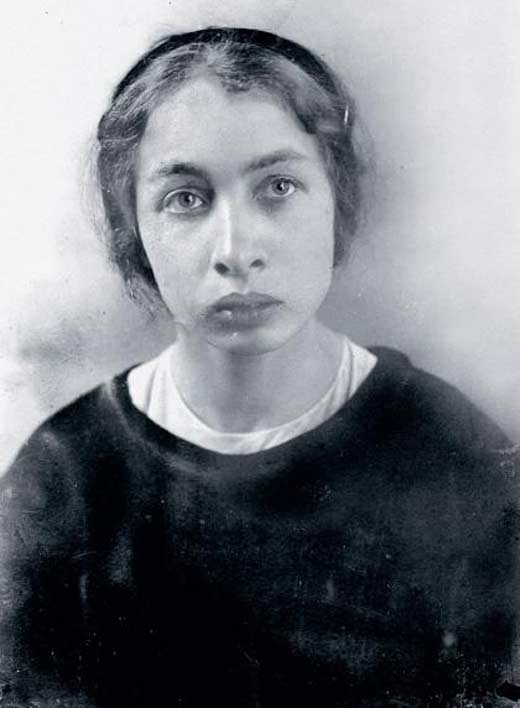
- Born: Feiga Haimovna Roytblat; 10 February 1890; Volhynian Governorate, Russian Empire
- Died: 3 September 1918 (aged 28); Moscow, Russian SFSR
- Cause of death: Execution by shooting
- Known for: attempted assassination of Vladimir Lenin

Fanny Efimovna Kaplan (Russian: Фанни Ефимовна Каплан; real name Feiga Haimovna Roytblat, Фейга Хаимовна Ройтблат; 10 February 1890 – 3 September 1918) was a Russian Socialist-Revolutionary who attempted to assassinate Vladimir Lenin. She was arrested and executed by the Cheka in 1918.

Born into a Jewish family, Kaplan served a sentence of hard labor during the tsarist years for her revolutionary activities. As a member of the Socialist Revolutionary Party, Kaplan viewed Lenin as a "traitor to the revolution" when the Bolsheviks enacted one-party rule and banned her party. On 30 August 1918, she approached Lenin, who was leaving a Moscow factory, and fired three shots. Lenin was badly injured by two of the shots she fired. Interrogated by the Cheka, she refused to name any accomplices before being executed. The Kaplan attempt and the Moisei Uritsky assassination were used by the government of Soviet Russia for the reinstatement of capital punishment, which had been abolished by the Russian Provisional Government in March 1917.

== Early life ==
Relatively little is known for certain about Kaplan's background. She was born into a Jewish family. Her father was a teacher, and she had seven siblings. There has been confusion about her full name. Fanny/Fanya was a common substitute for the Yiddish name Feiga. Vera Figner (in her memoirs, At Women's Katorga) stated that Kaplan's original name was Feiga Khaimovna Roytblat-Kaplan (Фейга Хаимовна Ройтблат-Каплан). However, other sources have stated that her original family name was Roytman (Ройтман), corresponding to the common German and Yiddish surname Reutemann (רויטמאן). She was also sometimes known by the given name Dora.

Kaplan was home educated and soon left home to work as a milliner in Odessa. She became a political revolutionary at an early age and joined a socialist group, the Socialist Revolutionaries (SRs). In 1906, when she was 16 years old, Kaplan was arrested in Kiev over her involvement in a terrorist bomb plot to blow up the city's governor, Vladimir Sukhomlinov. She was captured after a bomb she and her romantic partner were working on accidentally exploded. She was committed for life to the katorga, a hard labour prison camp. She served in the Maltsev and Akatuy prisons of Nerchinsk katorga, Siberia, where she lost her sight, which was partially restored later. She was released on 3 March 1917, after the February Revolution overthrew the imperial government. As a result of her imprisonment, Kaplan suffered from continuous headaches and periods of blindness.

Kaplan became disillusioned with Lenin in 1917–1918, due to conflict between the SRs and the Bolsheviks. The latter had strong support in the soviets, but in the 1917 Russian Constituent Assembly election, non-Bolsheviks were the majority. When the Assembly met in January 1918, a Socialist Revolutionary was elected president. The Bolsheviks responded by dissolving the Constituent Assembly. By August 1918, the Bolsheviks had banned most other parties. Most recently, they had banned the Left Socialist Revolutionaries (Left SRs), formerly the Bolsheviks' main coalition partners, who had rebelled against them in July in opposition to the Treaty of Brest-Litovsk. Kaplan decided to assassinate Lenin because she considered him "a traitor to the Revolution".

== Assassination attempt ==
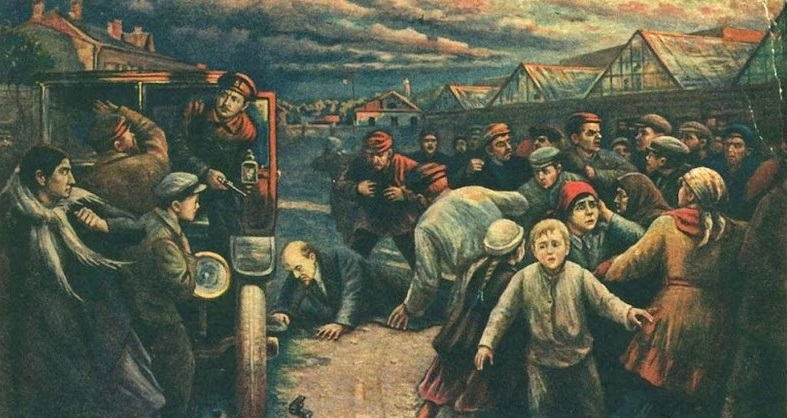
Vladimir Pchelin's depiction of the assassination attempt

On 30 August 1918, Lenin spoke at the Hammer and Sickle, an arms factory in southern Moscow. As Lenin left the building and before he had entered his car, Kaplan called out to him. When Lenin turned towards her, she fired three shots with a FN M1900 pistol. One bullet passed through Lenin's coat, and the other two struck him. One passed through his neck, punctured part of his left lung, and stopped near his right collarbone; the other lodged in his left shoulder.

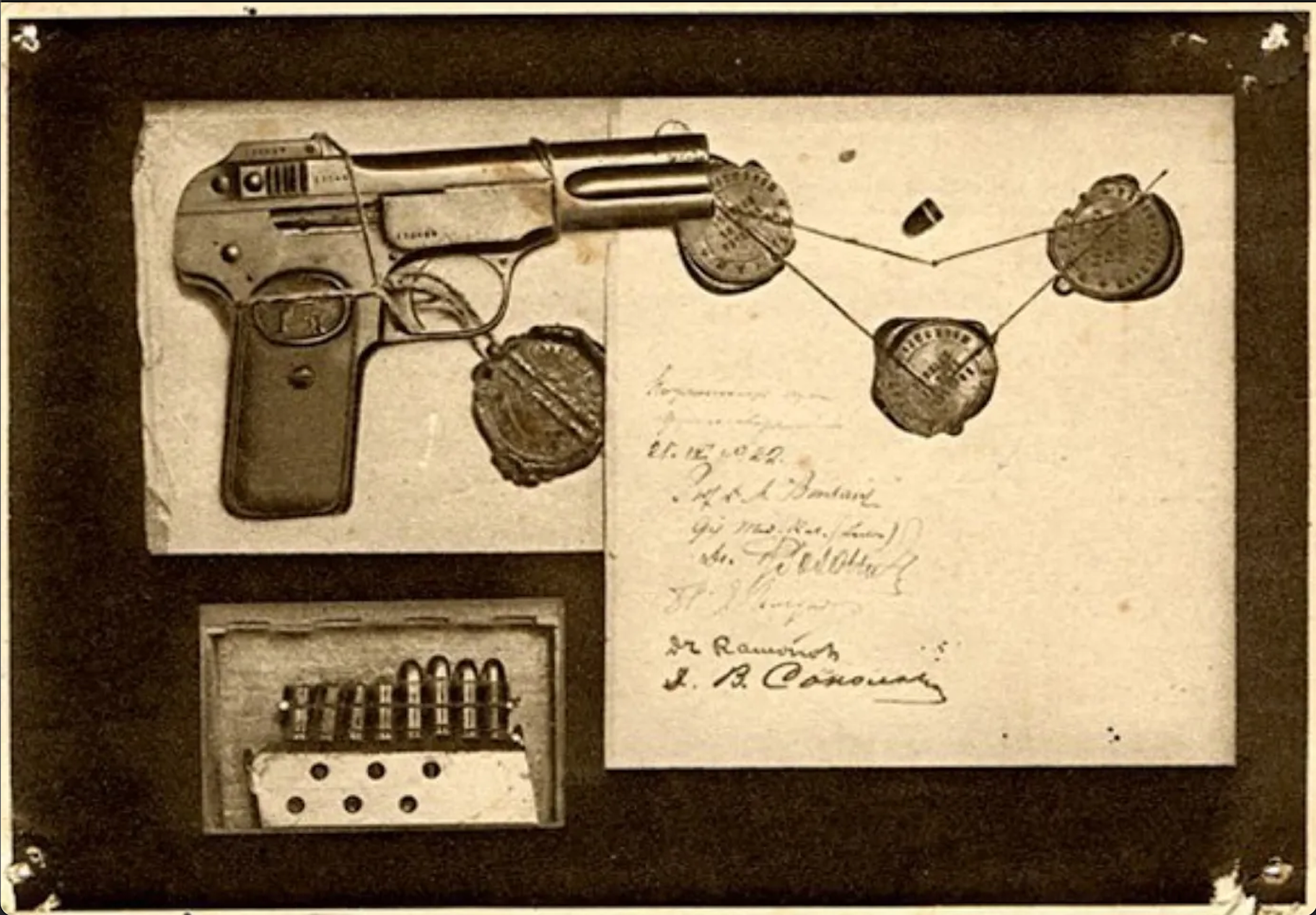
Fanny Kaplan's FN 1900 pistol, used in the attempted assassination of Lenin.

Lenin was taken back to his living quarters at the Kremlin. He feared that others might be planning to kill him and refused to leave the security of the Kremlin to seek medical attention. Doctors were brought in to treat him but could not remove the bullets outside a hospital. Despite the severity of his injuries, Lenin survived, but his health never fully recovered from the attack. It has been speculated that the shooting contributed to the strokes that incapacitated and eventually killed him in 1924.

== Capture and execution ==
There are contradictory stories of her capture. According to the testimony of Deputy Commissar S. N. Batulin, he was within 20 steps of Lenin when he heard three shots and saw Lenin face down on the ground. Afterwards, he identified a woman who he felt looked suspicious and detained her. That turned out to be Kaplan. However, the factory commissar N. I. Ivanov claimed to have arrested her after she had been identified by several children, who had followed her down the street. During interrogation by the Cheka, she made the following statement:

My name is Fanya Kaplan. Today I shot Lenin. I did it on my own. I will not say from whom I obtained my revolver. I will give no details. I had resolved to kill Lenin long ago. I consider him a traitor to the Revolution. I was exiled to Akatuy for participating in an assassination attempt against a Tsarist official in Kiev. I spent 11 years at hard labour. After the Revolution, I was freed. I favoured the Constituent Assembly and am still for it.

Kaplan referenced the Bolsheviks' growing authoritarianism, citing their forcible shutdown of the Constituent Assembly in January 1918, the elections to which they had lost. When it became clear that Kaplan would not implicate any accomplices, she was executed in Alexander Garden. The order was carried out by the commander of the Kremlin, the former Baltic sailor P. D. Malkov and a group of Latvian Bolsheviks, on 3 September 1918: Malkov took Kaplan to a Kremlin courtyard then used as a parking lot and shot her in the back of the head, while truck engines ran to drown out the noise. Her corpse was bundled into a barrel and set alight. The order came directly from Yakov Sverdlov, who according to some sources, only six weeks earlier, had ordered the murder of the Tsar and his family.

=== Guilt ===
Grigory Semyonov, a military commander in the SR who later turned state's evidence against the group, testified in 1922 that Kaplan had been a member of his organization and that he regarded her as the "best person to carry out the attack on Lenin".

Some historians such as Dmitri Volkogonov, Arkady Vaksberg and Donald Rayfield have questioned the actual role of Kaplan in the assassination attempt. Volkogonov suggested that "it is more likely" that Kaplan was actually not the culprit and described her assassination attempt as "another of the many mystifications of Bolshevik history". Vaksberg stated that Lidia Konopleva, another SR, was the culprit and believed that it would be all too comforting that Lenin narrowly avoided being assassinated by a woman whose personality is so far from the stereotype of a national hero. In particular, it had been suggested that she was working on behalf of others and, after her arrest, assumed sole responsibility. The main arguments put forth in that and other versions is that she was nearly blind, and none of the witnesses actually saw her fire the gun. Another argument points to the contradiction between the official Soviet account and official documents, particularly a radiogram by Jēkabs Peterss that mentions the arrest of several suspects, instead of only one. Furthermore, the bullet removed from Lenin's neck after his death was found to have been fired from a weapon other than the one that Kaplan had. Semion Lyandres went so far as to argue that Kaplan was not even a member of the SR.

== Legacy ==
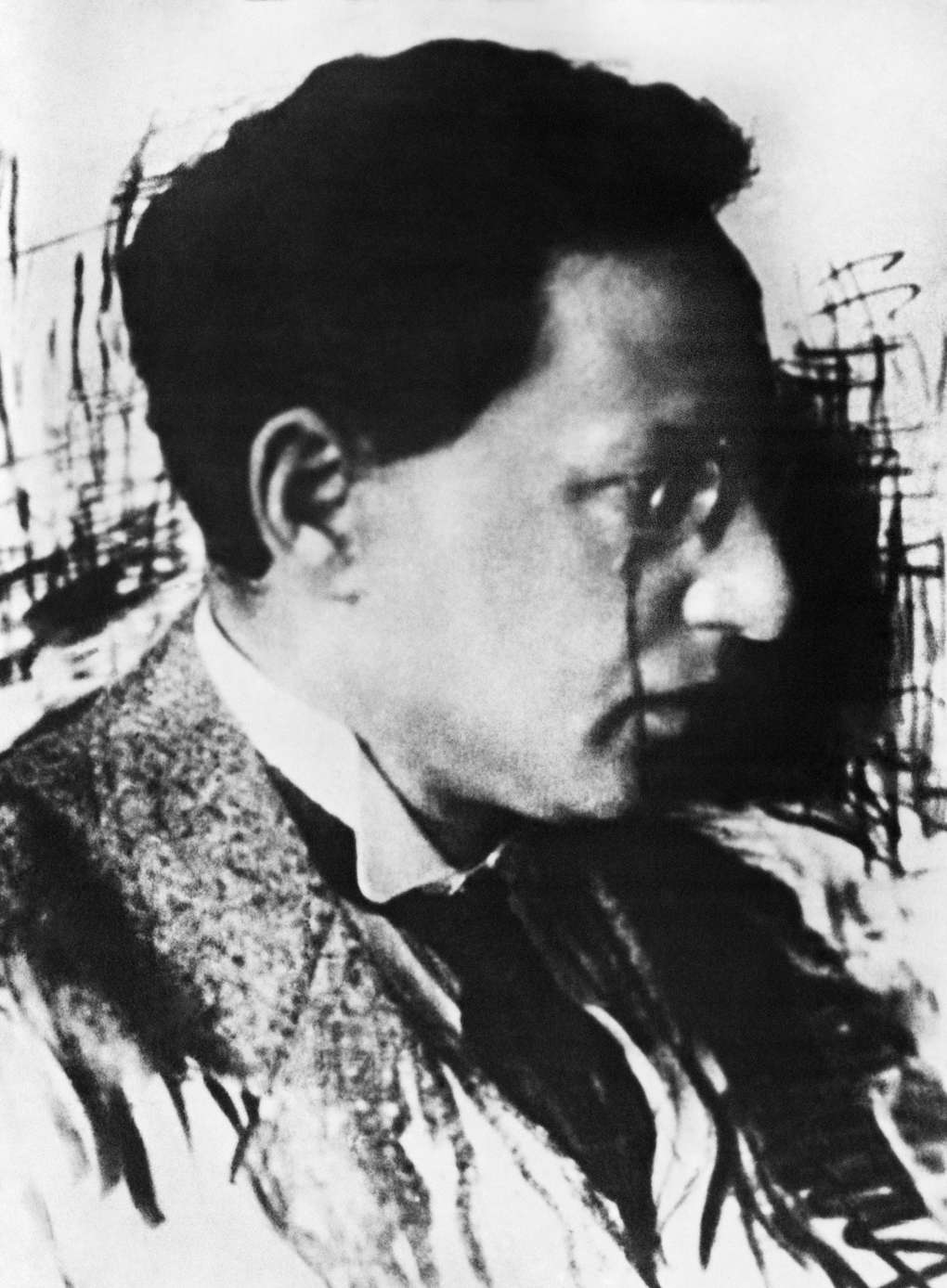
Moisei Uritsky

Despite her refusal to name accomplices, the official announcement of the assassination attempt had Sverdlov blame the Right SRs although it denied any involvement. Moisei Uritsky, the People's Commissar for Internal Affairs in the Northern Region and the head of the Cheka in Petrograd, had been assassinated on the same day as the attempt on Lenin's life. The Cheka did not find any evidence linking both events, but their occurrence in quick succession appeared significant in the context of the intensifying civil war. The Bolsheviks' reaction was an abrupt escalation in the persecution of their opponents.

An official decree announcing the Red Terror was issued only hours after the Kaplan shooting and called for an "all-out struggle against enemies of the revolution". In the next few months, about 800 Right SRs and other political opponents of Bolsheviks were executed. During the first year, the scope of the Red Terror expanded significantly.

== In fiction ==
In the 1939 Soviet film Lenin in 1918 directed by Mikhail Romm, Natalia Efron portrays Kaplan. In the 1934 Hollywood film British Agent directed by Michael Curtiz, Corinne Williams and Zozia Tanina portray Kaplan. In the West German TV series Bürgerkrieg in Rußland (1967), Peggy Parnas portrays Franja Kaplan. In the 1983 British TV series Reilly, Ace of Spies, Sara Clee portrays Kaplan. The life of Fanny Kaplan was portrayed in the Ukrainian film My Grandmother Fanny Kaplan (2016) directed by Olena Demyanenko.

Kaplan has been the subject of or a character in several plays (including Fanny Kaplan by Venedikt Yerofeyev; Kill me, o my beloved! by Elena Isaeva; The Bolsheviks by Mikhail Shatrov) and books (Europe Central by William T. Vollmann). Pamela Adlon's character in History of the World, Part II, Fanny Mudman, is loosely based on Kaplan, most notably when she attempts to kill Lenin.

== See also ==
- Leonid Kannegisser
- Fritz Platten
- Faina Stavskaya
