= Donskoye Cemetery =

Cemetery in Moscow, Russia

- Новое Донское кладбище
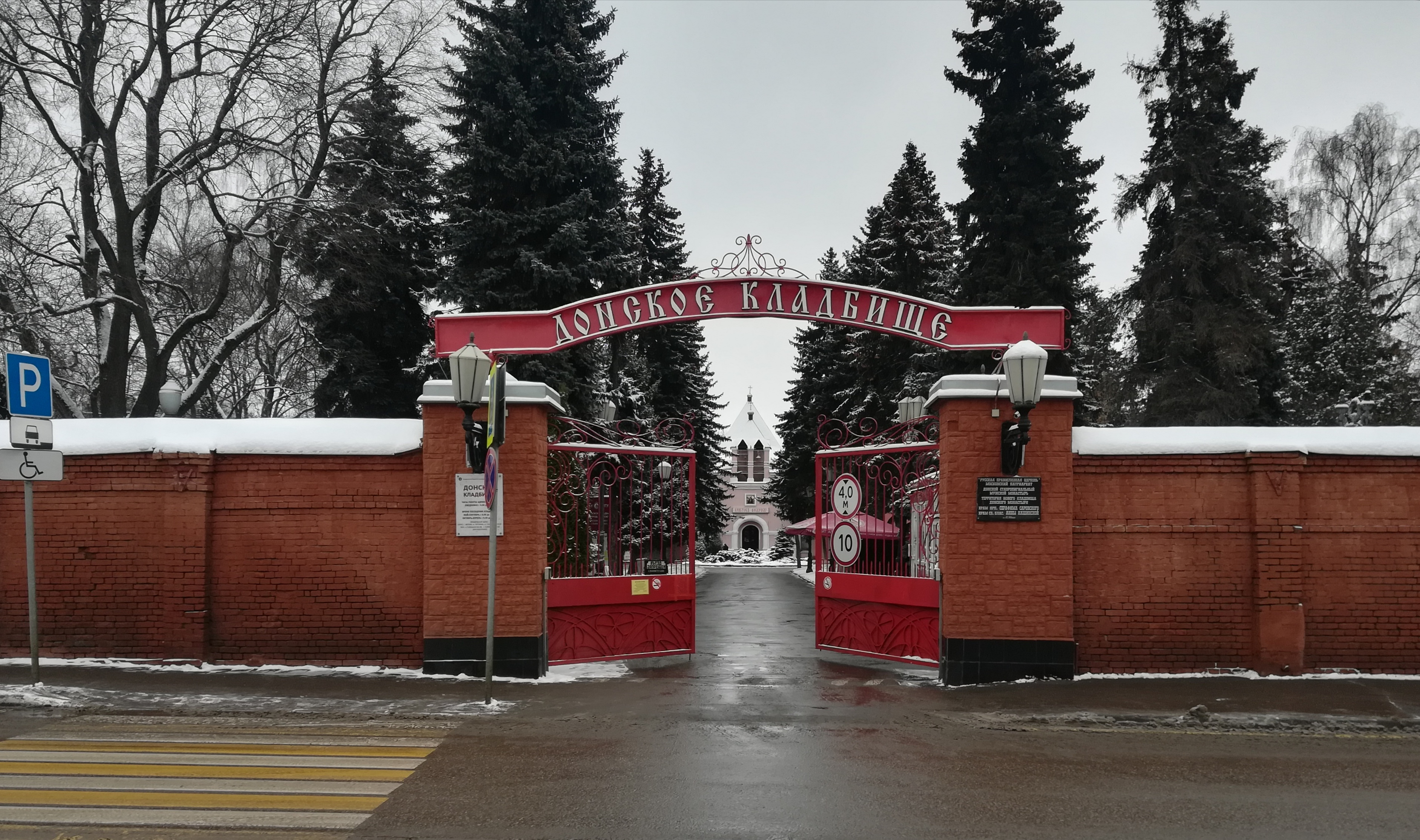
- Interactive map of Donskoye Cemetery

Details
- Established: 1910
- Location: Moscow
- Country: Russia
- Coordinates: 55°42′44″N 37°36′08″E

The New Donskoy Cemetery (Новое Донское кладбище) is a 20th-century necropolis sprawling to the south from the Donskoy Monastery in the south-west of Central Moscow, Russia. It has been closed for new burials since the 1980s.

== History ==
The cemetery outside the monastery walls was established in 1910, when there was no more place for new burials inside the medieval monastery. The speaker of the first Russian parliament, Sergey Muromtsev, was among the first notables to be interred there. Maria Gartung, the daughter of Alexander Pushkin who served for Leo Tolstoy as a model for Anna Karenina, was buried in 1919.

After the Russian Revolution, scores of Soviet soldiers killed during the Battle of Moscow and people executed by NKVD were secretly buried at the Donskoy Cemetery. It is believed that the Mass graves from the era contain the remains of Mikhail Tukhachevsky, Pyotr Krasnov, Vsevolod Meyerhold, Isaac Babel, and other victims of Stalin's regime. The remains of painter Valentin Serov, composer Sergei Taneyev, and poet Vladimir Mayakovsky were exhumed and transferred to the more prestigious Novodevichy Cemetery.

In 1927 the former church of St. Seraphim was rebuilt to become the first crematorium in Moscow. Most of the mortal remains buried at the New Donskoy Cemetery are therefore interred in urns. The church featured extended vaults which seemed suitable to accommodate the technical equipment for the cremation of bodies. The new crematorium was opened in October 1927 and most of the individuals buried in the Kremlin Wall Necropolis were cremated here. Until the mid-1970s the Donskoy crematorium remained the only one of its kind in Moscow.

== "Common Grave Number 1" ==
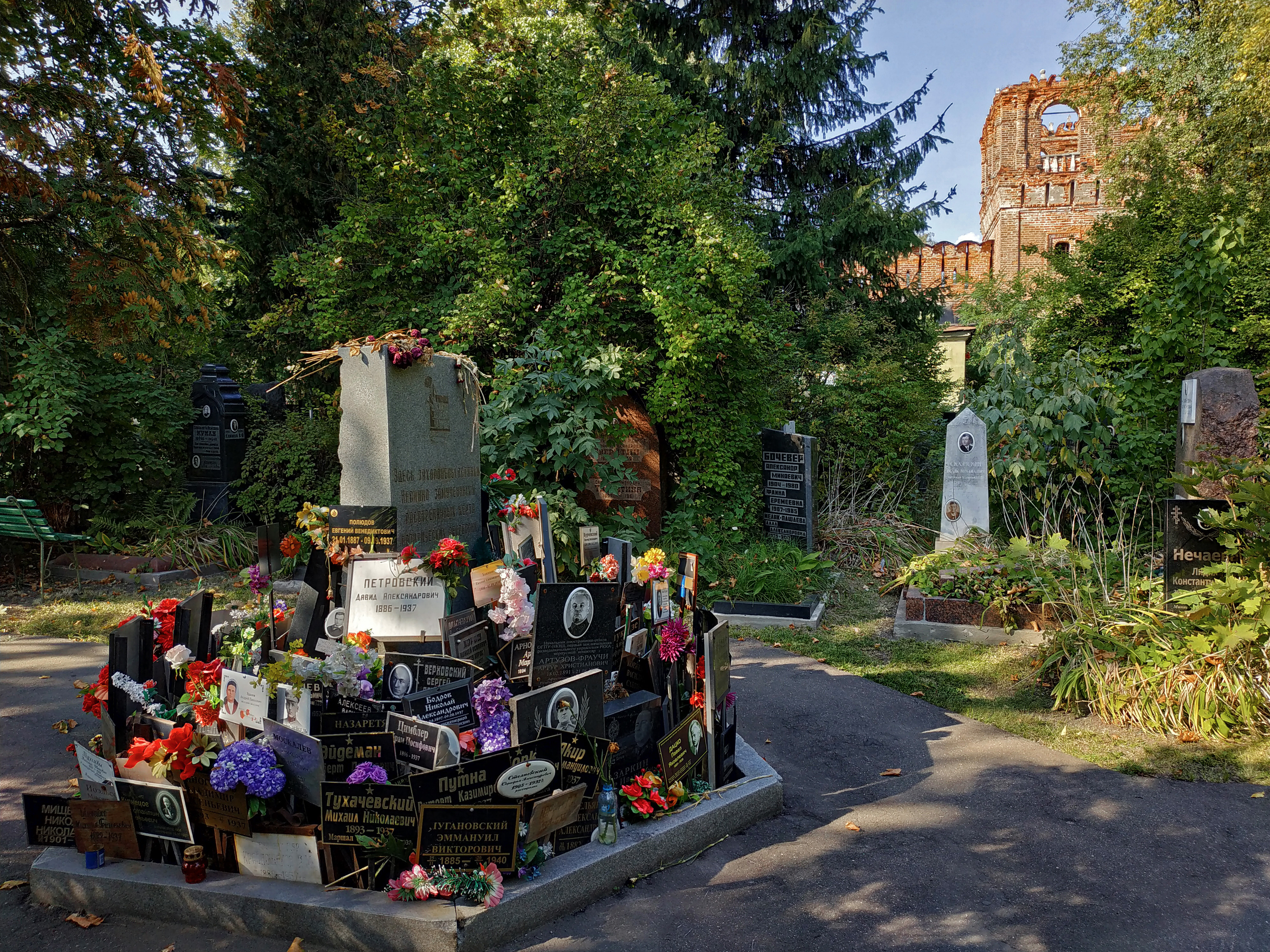
"Common Grave Number 1" at Donskoye Cemetery

In 1930, Stalinist authorities dug a large pit in the east portion of the cemetery to act as a Mass grave for the cremated ashes of executed political prisoners from Joseph Stalin's Great Purge; the site was intentionally chosen for its isolation from normal burial sites due to its "shameful" history as Eastern Orthodox consecrated ground during the Tsarist era, which the Soviets had revoked as part of state atheism in the USSR. The ashes of numerous executed prisoners, both common and high-ranking—including notorious figures such as Nikolai Yezhov, Mikhail Tukhachevsky, Pavel Alexandrovich Alexandrov etc. – were unceremoniously dumped here until the grave was filled and closed in 1942. The pit currently bears two markers, one erected during the Soviet era and simply reading "Common Grave Number One: Unclaimed Ashes from 1930–42." while the other was erected after 1989 and reads "Here lie the remains of the innocent victims of political repressions in 1930–42 who were shot. To their eternal memory."

== Notable burials ==
- Rudolf Abel (1903–1971), Soviet spy
- Ilya Anisimov (1862–1928), ethnographer
- Anton Denikin (1872–1947), general
- Vladimir Fogel (1902–1929), actor
- Ivan Ilyin (1883–1954), political philosopher
- Vladimir Pikalov (1924–2003), general
- Klara Rumyanova (1929—2004), actress
- Vladimir Kappel (1883–1920), general
- Lev Kopelev (1912–1997), author and dissident
- Sergei Khudyakov (1902–1950), aviator
- Solomon Mikhoels (1890–1948), actor
- Konon Molody (1922–1970), KGB officer
- Sergey Muromtsev (1850–1910), lawyer
- Faina Ranevskaya (1896–1984), actress
- Abram Shatskes (1900–1961), pianist
- Ivan Shmelyov (1873–1950), writer
- Aleksandr Solzhenitsyn (1918–2008), writer and dissident
- Pavel Sudoplatov (1907–1996), Soviet spy
- Valeriya Novodvorskaya (1950-2014), dissident

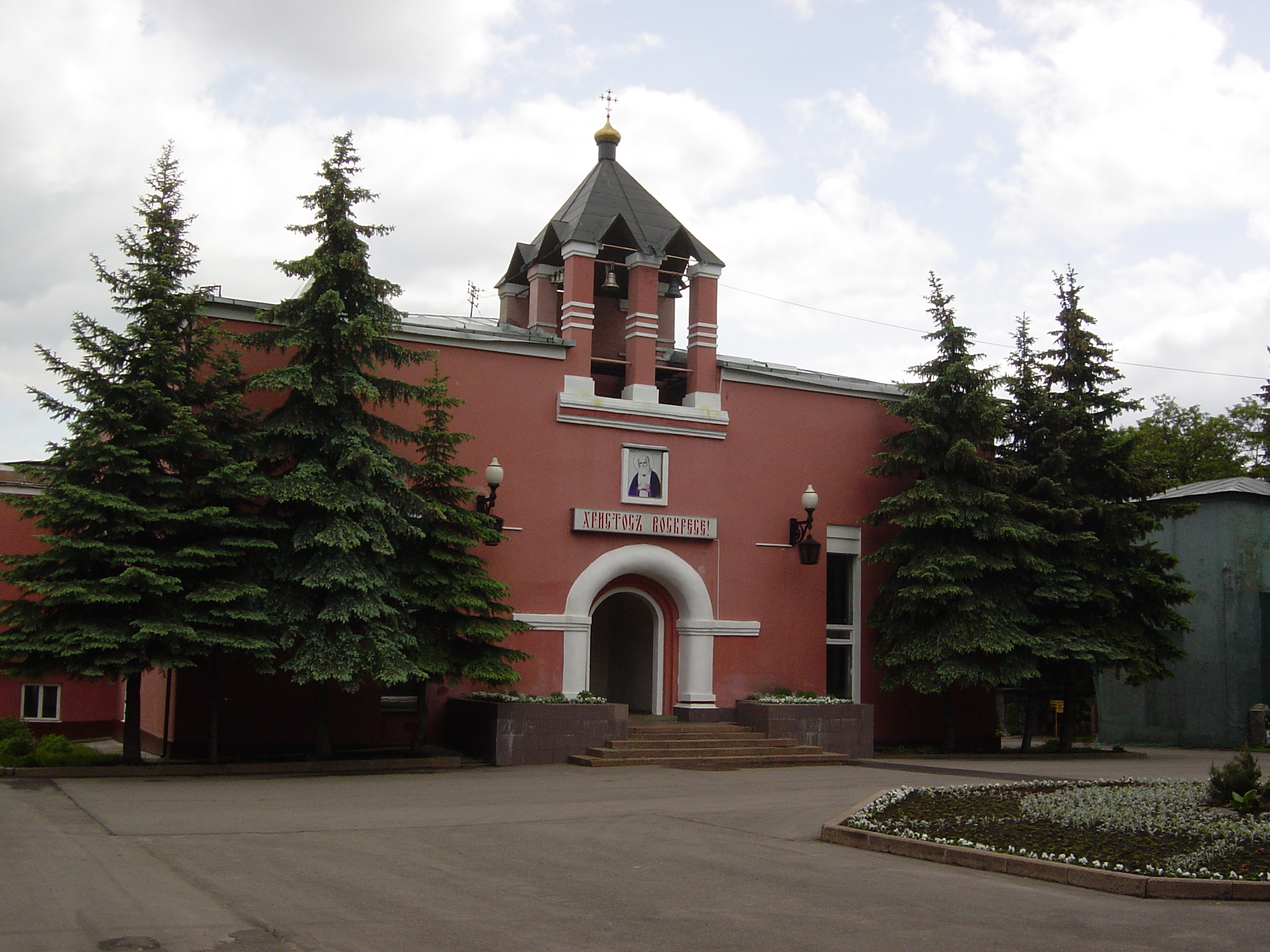
The Orthodox church of St. Anna of Kashin was used by the Soviets as the first crematorium in the country.

== Supposed secret burials ==
- Anna Abrikosova (1882–1936), Catholic nun
- Isaac Babel (1894–1940), writer executed by NKVD
- Lavrentiy Beria (1899-1953), head of NKVD
- Vasily Blyukher (1889–1938), Soviet marshal
- Milan Gorkić (1904–1937), politician executed by NKVD
- Stanisław Kosior (1889–1939), politician executed in Great Purge
- Vsevolod Meyerhold (1874–1940), theater director executed in Great Purge
- Yevgeny Miller (1867–1939), general kidnapped and executed by NKVD
- Oleg Penkovsky (1919–1963), British spy executed by USSR
- Faina Stavskaya (1890–1937), Belarusian revolutionary killed in Great Purge
- Mikhail Tukhachevsky (1893–1937), general executed by Stalin
- Pavel Alexandrovich Alexandrov (1866–1940), lawyer executed by NKVD
- Alexander Yegorov (1883–1939), Soviet marshal killed in Great Purge
- Nikolai Yezhov (1895–1940), NKVD director killed by Stalin
