= Volodarskyi Raion =

Volodarskyi Raion may refer to:

- Volodarka Raion, a raion in Kyiv Oblast, Ukraine
- Volodarske Raion, a raion in Donetsk Oblast, Ukraine

== See also ==
- Volodarsky District
