= Volodarsky (rural locality) =

Volodarsky (Russian: Волода́рский; masculine), Volodarskaya (Волода́рская; feminine), Volodarskoye (Волода́рское; neuter), or Volodarskogo (Волода́рского; masculine genitive) is the name of several rural localities (settlements, khutors, villages, and logging depot settlements) in Russia:

- Volodarsky, Astrakhan Oblast, a settlement in Volodarsky Selsoviet of Volodarsky District of Astrakhan Oblast
- Volodarsky, Orenburg Oblast, a settlement in Volodarsky Selsoviet of Pervomaysky District of Orenburg Oblast
- Volodarsky, Oryol Oblast, a settlement in Arkhangelsky Selsoviet of Uritsky District of Oryol Oblast
- Volodarsky, Rostov Oblast, a khutor in Bozhkovskoye Rural Settlement of Krasnosulinsky District of Rostov Oblast
- Volodarsky, Republic of Tatarstan, a settlement in Nizhnekamsky District of the Republic of Tatarstan
- Volodarsky, Ulyanovsk Oblast, a settlement in Orekhovsky Rural Okrug of Radishchevsky District of Ulyanovsk Oblast
- Volodarskoye, Republic of Bashkortostan, a village in Kilimovsky Selsoviet of Buzdyaksky District of the Republic of Bashkortostan
- Volodarskoye, Kaluga Oblast, a village in Ferzikovsky District of Kaluga Oblast
- Volodarskoye, Leningrad Oblast, a logging depot settlement in Volodarskoye Settlement Municipal Formation of Luzhsky District of Leningrad Oblast
- Volodarskoye, Tver Oblast, a village in Kimrsky District of Tver Oblast
- Volodarskaya, Leningrad Oblast, a village under the administrative jurisdiction of Voznesenskoye Settlement Municipal Formation, Podporozhsky District, Leningrad Oblast
- Volodarskaya, Oryol Oblast, a village in Medvedevsky Selsoviet of Glazunovsky District of Oryol Oblast
- Volodarskogo, Lipetsk Oblast, a settlement in Izmalkovsky District of Lipetsk Oblast
- Volodarskogo, Moscow Oblast, a settlement in Leninsky District of Moscow Oblast
