= V. Volodarsky =

Russian politician (1891–1918)

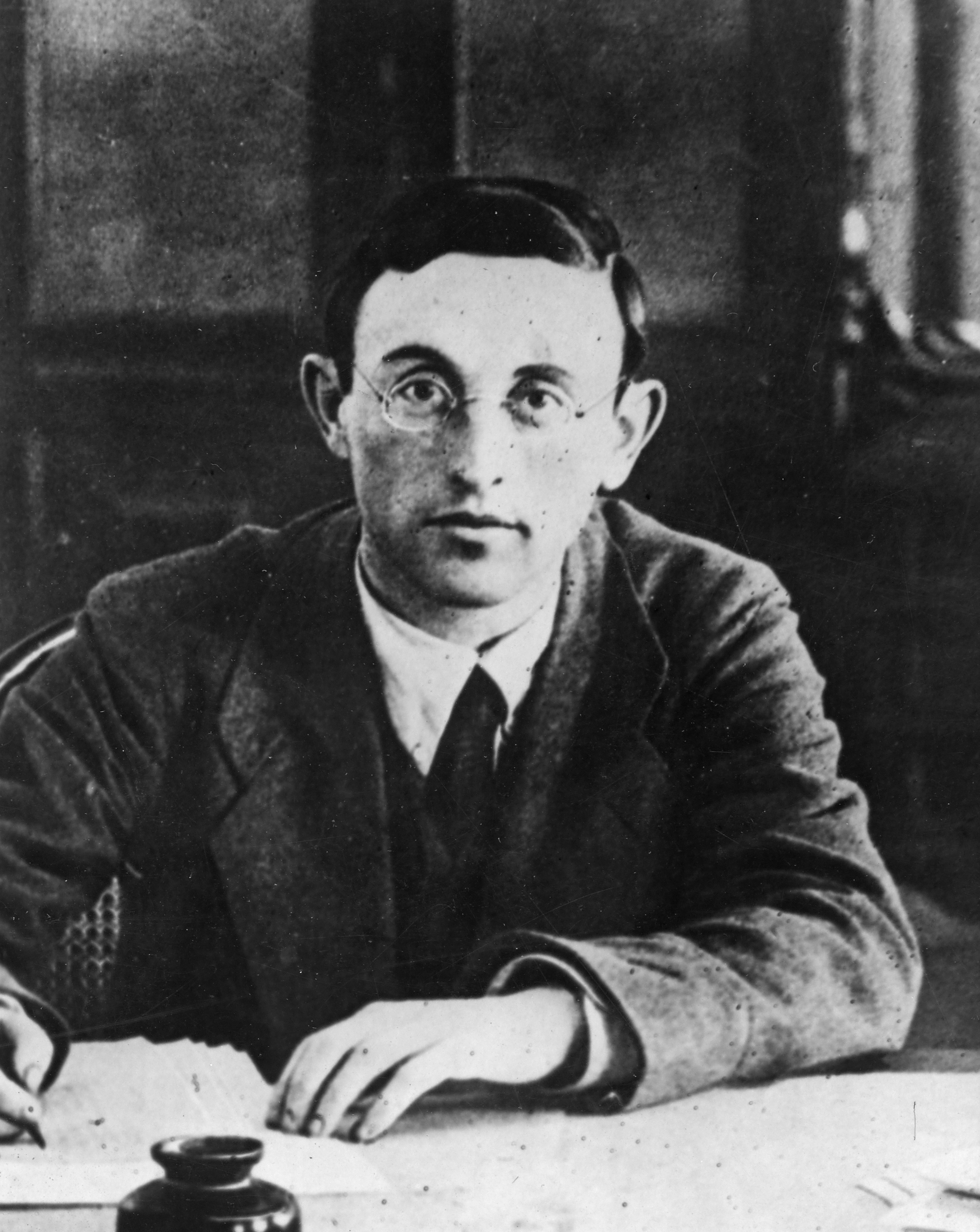
- Born: Moisey Markovich Goldstein; December 11, 1891; Ostropol, Ukraine, Russian Empire
- Died: June 20, 1918 (aged 26); Petrograd, Russian SFSR
- Resting place: Field of Mars, St. Petersburg
- Occupations: Revolutionary politician, propagandist
- Years active: 1905–1918
- Organization(s): Bund; Russian Social Democratic Labour Party; RSDLP (Internationalists); Russian Communist Party (Bolsheviks)
- Known for: Marxist revolutionary, propagandist
- Movement: Social democracy, Communism

Moisei Markovich Goldshtein (Note: Russian: Моисе́й Ма́ркович Гольдште́йн, В. Волода́рский.) (December 11, 1891 – June 20, 1918), best known by his underground pseudonym V. Volodarsky, was an ethnic Jewish Marxist revolutionary and Soviet politician.

Volodarsky, a prominent public speaker, newspaper editor, and top government official for the Bolshevik Party, was assassinated by Nikita Sergeyev, a member of the Socialist Revolutionary Party in June 1918.

Volodarsky's death increased political tension in Petrograd amidst economic collapse and worsening civil war, and was a contributing factor to the Red Terror which erupted around Soviet Russia during the second half of 1918.

== Biography ==
=== Early years ===
Moisei Goldshtein (V. Volodarsky) was born to the family of a poor Jewish craftsman in Ostropol, in the Volhynian Governorate of the Russian Empire (present-day Ukraine).

In 1905, he became involved in revolutionary activity within the General Jewish Labour Bund in Lithuania, Poland and Russia, but soon joined Spilka, the Ukrainian Social Democratic organization which aligned itself with the Menshevik faction of the Russian Social Democratic Labor Party. (Note: Some sources claim that Volodarsky was a Menshevik prior to 1917, in apparent conflation of the autonomous-but-allied Spilka with that organization. See, for example, Boris Souvarine, Stalin: A Critical Survey of Bolshevism. Longmans, Green & Co., 1939; p. 161.)

After the defeat of the 1905–07 revolution, Volodarsky was briefly imprisoned in 1908. After his release he returned to underground political activity in Volhynia. This led to a further arrest and in 1911 to a sentence of internal exile to the northern city of Arkhangelsk, but he dodged this fate through inclusion in the general amnesty of 1913.

Continued persecution led him to emigrate to the United States, settling in Philadelphia and taking a position as a cutter in a garment factory. This brought him into contact with the trade union movement, and he quickly took a leading role as a union activist with the International Ladies' Garment Workers' Union and journalist. He also became active in the Socialist Party of America, eventually relocating to New York City to work on the staff of the Russian-language socialist weekly there, Novyi Mir [New World].

=== Return to Russia ===
Following the February Revolution and the overthrow of the Romanov dynasty, Volodarsky returned to Russia. Arriving in April 1917, he joined the Mezhraiontsy group, an anti-war party closely associated with Leon Trotsky that took an ideological position midway between the feuding Mensheviks and Bolsheviks. He was also elected to the Petrograd City Duma. He was not long in switching affiliation to Lenin and the Bolsheviks, however, joining the Bolshevik Party in May, several months ahead of the formal merger of the mezhraiontsy with the Bolsheviks in August — a merger which he helped to broker.

Volodarsky was named to the Petrograd Committee of the Bolshevik Party as soon as he joined the organization and was made a member of that group's executive committee not long after.

=== The October Revolution ===
One of the Bolsheviks' most effective public speakers. Anatoly Lunacharsky, who met Volodarsky for the first time in the spring of 1917, was effusive about Volodarsky's ability as a public speaker in a short 1923 biography:

"From a literary standpoint Volodarsky's speeches were not remarkable for originality of form or for that richness of metaphor with which Trotsky regaled his audiences in superabundance. In this respect Volodarsky's speeches were on the dry side.... His speeches were like a machine: there was nothing superfluous, every component meshed with the next, everything was metallic glitter, everything throbbed with an inner charge of electricity. Perhaps this was the American style of eloquence; but America, which sent back to us so many Russians who had been through her iron school, produced no other orator to compare with Volodarsky. His voice seemed to print the words — it had a graphic, poster-like quality with a metallic ring to it. The sentences flowed remarkably evenly and with an unvarying pressure which was only occasionally heightened. In its clarity and regularity the rhythm of his speech reminded me more than anything else of Mayakovsky's style of declamation.... His speeches were spell-binding. they were not long, they were unusually easy to understand, each one a whole armory of slogans, of sharpm well-aimed verbal shafts."

Volodarsky focused his activity in the Peterhof area, which included the massive Putilov works. He was instrumental in bringing the majority of that 30,000 member workforce over to the Bolsheviks in the summer of 1917. He was assigned by the Central Committee of the Bolshevik Party to dissuade the First Machine Gun Regiment from participating in spontaneous street demonstrations during the first week of July. This proved unsuccessful, however, and the chaos of the so-called July Days riots prompted a backlash by the Provisional Government against the Bolshevik Party, who was blamed for the spontaneous uprising.

During the repression that followed in July and August, Volodarsky continued to speak on behalf of the Bolsheviks in the semi-illegal conditions which prevailed.

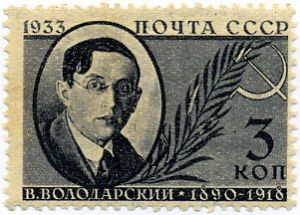
1933 stamp with an image of Volodarsky.

He was a fierce opponent of the political line favored by Lev Kamenev and Grigory Zinoviev, who sought a multi-party socialist government as the only sustainable option rather than the insurrection and overthrow of the Provisional Government and dispersal of the elected Constituent Assembly, the tactic insisted upon by party leader V.I. Lenin.

=== Journalist and censor ===
At the Second Congress of Soviets on October 26, Volodarsky was elected to the All-Russian Central Executive Committee (VTsIK). He was appointed editor of the Red Gazette in Petrograd and chief of the press division of the executive committee of the Union of Northern Communes, making him in effect the commissar for press, agitation, and propaganda — with broad censorship powers — for the northern region.

As Commissar for Press Affairs, Volodarsky oversaw a censorship which shut down for political reasons approximately 150 Petrograd newspapers with a combined circulation of over two million copies. He thereby became a public official gaining personal enmity of political opponents of the Bolshevik regime.

On February 23, with the Army of Imperial Germany advancing against a thin and disorganized defence, the executive committee of the Petrograd Soviet conducted a mass campaign of military recruitment meetings in the theaters around the city. Volodarsky joined other prominent Bolshevik orators, including Lunacharsky, Grigory Zinoviev, Nikolai Bukharin, Fyodor Raskolnikov, as well as several leaders of the allied Left Socialist-Revolutionaries in making appeals for Petrograders to join the ranks of the Red Army in preparation for its defense against the German invasion.

This emergency campaign generated few recruits as, in the words of historian Alexander Rabinowitch, "revolutionary enthusiasm did not translate into a willingness to fight." Those previously supporting Leon Trotsky's bold slogan of "neither war nor peace" with Germany, hoping that the Kaiser would focus his forces elsewhere, appeared defeated as the enemy wave continued to advance unabated.

Volodarsky, an ultra-radical "Left Communist" in 1918, was an outspoken opponent of the Brest-Litovsk Treaty, the one-sided surrender deal scorned by Trotsky which called for the permanent massive loss of Russian territory to Germany. However, in the early morning hours of February 24, a mere two-and-a-half hours before expiration of a German ultimatum, Volodarsky and a number of other prominent Left Communist members of the (multi-party) Central Executive Committee maintained party discipline and voted to sign the onerous surrender document, which was approved by a final vote of 116 in favor to 85 opposed, with 26 abstaining.

=== Background ===
May and June 1918 was a time of tumult in Petrograd, with more than 70 worker protests of various kinds erupting in Soviet Russia, including 18 strikes or work stoppages in the former capital city.

Although the Bolsheviks initially governed in coalition with the Left Socialist-Revolutionaries, a radical split group which broke with the main PSR organization in 1917, Socialist-Revolutionary Party regulars — the leading group in the deposed Constituent Assembly — were deeply hostile to the Bolsheviks' armed overthrow of the government. Successors of the terroristically inclined Narodnik movement, the PSR retained the use of coordinated individual violence as part of its revolutionary repertoire and had debated internally whether such action should be taken against the Bolshevik interlopers.

Volodarsky in 1918.

New elections to the Petrograd Soviet were demanded, with the Bolsheviks scrambling to retain control of the Petrograd Soviet. On May 20 at a meeting of Petrograd Bolshevik activists, Petrograd party chief Grigory Zinoviev proposed a scheme allowing Red Army soldiers equal representation to workers at preliminary district conferences which would then elect new members to the Petrograd Soviet. As the Red Army remained a bulwark of support for the Bolsheviks, this two-stage election system increased the likelihood of the Communists retaining power through a regular election process. This system drew criticism and was rejected by the Bolshevik Party itself, however, since the election statute called for direct elections on June 15, and the change was seen as something that would undermine the entire Soviet system.

On May 27 large meetings were held at large factories throughout the city focusing on food supply, rationing, and Bolshevik plans to organize food requisitioning detachments to take by force the grain that was not being sold to the state for rapidly depreciating paper money. The democratically elected Constituent Assembly had been shut down by the Bolsheviks in January, press censorship had interfered with production of non-Bolshevik newspapers, and workers at the Nicholas and Alexandrov locomotive works and the Obukhov works — many of whom were former peasants with roots in the village and loyalty to the Socialist Revolutionary Party (PSR) — were in a fighting mood.

Instead of the two-stage elections advocated by Zinoviev, the Bolsheviks pinned their hopes on the fact that only 260 of 677 seats on the Soviet were designated for workers of functioning enterprises, with the rest assigned to organizations and institutions more favorable to the current regime. The subsequent weeks were consumed by an electoral campaign, with the Bolsheviks attempting to make the claim to workers that the choice was between their own party's hegemony and right wing military dictatorship presaged by the Kornilov Revolt of the previous August.

On June 16, 1918, representatives of the Obukhov Works voted to send a delegation to Grigory Zinoviev to demand that the government be expanded from its current narrow monopoly of parties to include representatives of all other radical political groups and insisting upon convocation of a Constituent Assembly. This petition was rejected, but Zinoviev and Lunacharsky agreed to address a mass meeting of Obukhov workers at their plant on June 20. The meeting was raucous and both the representatives of the Bolshevik government were driven from the meeting by a massive wave of heckling.

=== Volodarsky assassination ===
At about the same time as this rowdy June 20 meeting at the Obukhov plant, nearby in the Nevsky District, Volodarsky was assassinated by Nikita Sergeyev. A dragnet followed during which about 15 people were arrested in a search of buildings near the crime scene. Following preliminary investigation, all but three were released, including Grigory Eremeev, a popular leader at the Obukhov Works and member of the Socialist Revolutionary Party.

Historian Alexander Rabinowitch, who spent much of his academic career studying the Bolshevik organization of Petrograd during the early years of the revolution, indicates that Eremeev had "no connection to Volodarsky's killing" and that Petrograd Cheka documents suggest that "Soviet authorities used the sweep of the district, prompted by the search for Volodarsky's killer, to arrest him and other 'troublemakers,' and also to press the PCheka to keep them under lock and key."

An "Italian strike" followed on June 21, with the enraged Obukhov workers throwing out managers and occupying the plant until Eremeev was released.

Zinoviev and other top Bolshevik authorities in Petrograd were effectively trapped between agitated workers, such as those of the Obukhov plant, on the one hand, and pro-Soviet "hotheads," on the other, who sought violent retribution against internal enemies in retaliation for Volodarsky's assassination. Chief of the Petrograd Cheka Moisei Uritsky, characterized by the Bolsheviks as a terroristically inclined hardliner in non-archival historigraphy, actually played a moderating role in this instance, pushing Zinoviev to "quell the hotheads," according to Rabinowitch.

With respect to the Obukhov Works, Zinoviev took a hard line, placing the neighborhood around it under martial law and shutting down the local PSR organization by closing the party's local club as well as city headquarters and arresting party activists.

Volodarsky's funeral was used as an opportunity for a mass demonstration in support of the Bolshevik government, with Kronstadt sailors marching in the procession, 500 of whom were used to suppress dissident minelayers who had attempted to lend support to the wildcat strike at the Obukhov plant. Volodarsky's assassination, attributed to the Socialist-Revolutionary Party, served to bolster support for the regime, softening complaints about lack of broad partisan representation and causing ongoing dissatisfaction over food supply to take a back seat to immediate politics.

He was assassinated by Grigory Semënov, a member of the Central Battle Unit of the Socialist-Revolutionary Party.

After lying in state at the Tauride Palace in Petrograd, Volodarsky's body was buried at the Monument to the Fighters of the Revolution on St. Petersburg's Field of Mars.

=== The Volodarsky killing and the Red Terror ===
After Volodarsky's killing, a stream of worker delegations made their way to Grigory Zinoviev's office in Smolnyi demanding vengeance for the act of terrorism. Zinoviev resisted this effort, however, declaring that "there be no excesses." A lid was kept on the pot of ultra-violence, but pressure was building.

Among those who sought to use Volodarsky's assassination as a pretext for retaliatory violence was Lenin, who did not approve of the restraint shown by Zinoviev, Uritsky, and the Petrograd party organization. On June 26, 1918, Lenin sent an angry rebuke from the Kremlin Moscow to Zinoviev, his former right-hand man in exile:

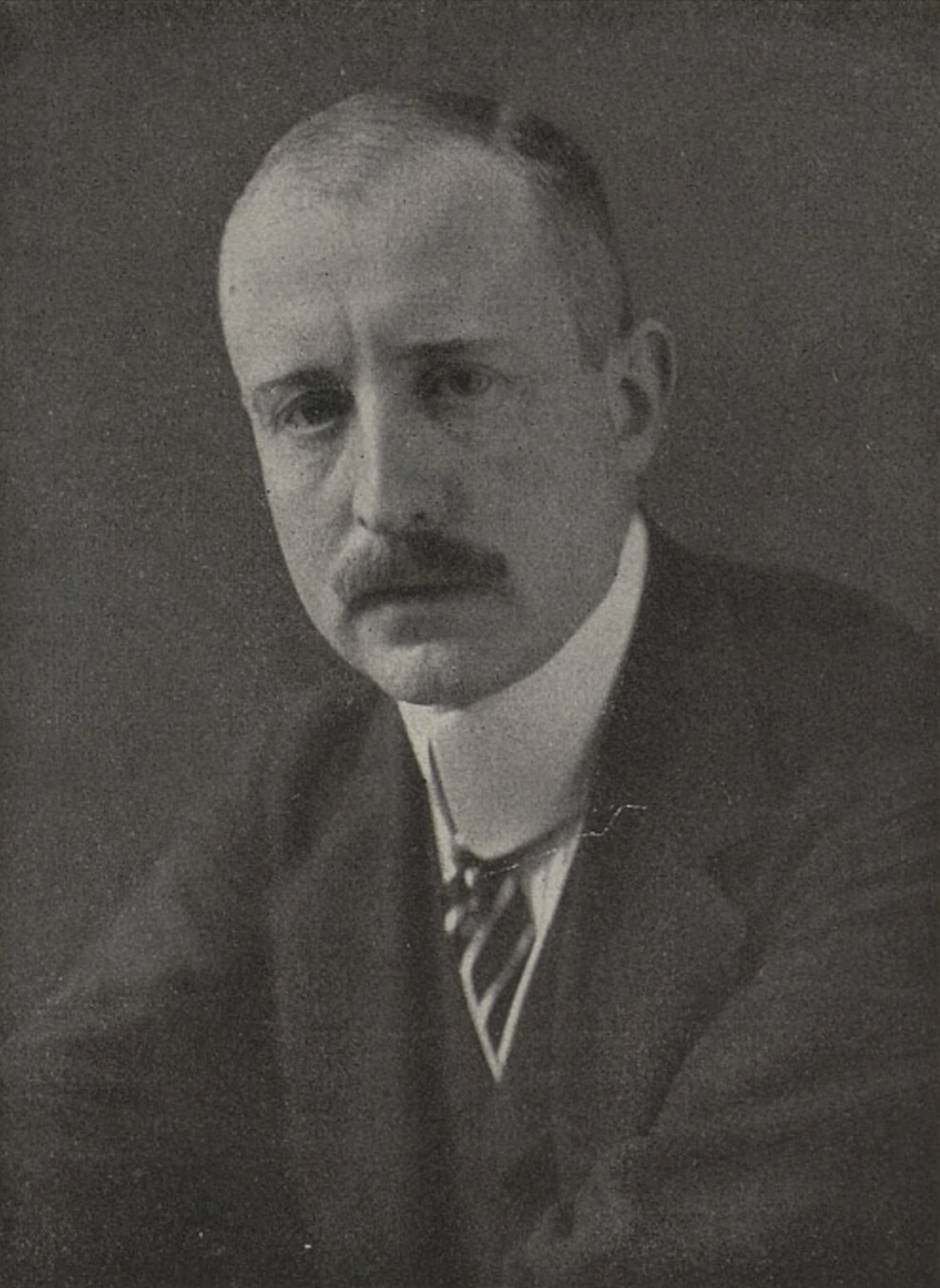
The assassination of German ambassador Wilhelm von Mirbach in July by PSR terrorists accelerated the slide to Red Terror in 1918.

"Only today we have heard at the [Central Committee of the Communist Party] that in Petrograd the workers wanted to reply to the murder of Volodarsky by mass terror and that you (not you personally, but the Petrograd Central Committee members, or Petrograd Committee members) restrained them.

I protest most emphatically!

We are discrediting ourselves: we threaten mass terror, even in resolutions of the Soviet of Deputies, yet when it comes to action we obstruct the revolutionary initiative of the masses, a quite correct one.

This is im-possible!

The terrorists will consider us old women. This is wartime above all. We must encourage the energy and mass character of the terror against the counterrevolutionaries, and particularly in Petrograd, the example of which is decisive."

Although it did not directly lead to bloody retribution, Volodarsky's assassination contributed significantly to a climate of fear, repression, and reprisal that swept Soviet Russia. It was a leading event to a spring and summer of 1918 that saw the expulsion of the Left SRs from the government, an increase in activity of British intelligence operations, the orchestrated assassination of German ambassador Count Wilhelm von Mirbach, the expansion of the Civil War in the south, in the east, in the northwest, and the growing threat of famine and associated disease.

A Right Wing military governments was established in Omsk in western Siberia and 40,000 former prisoners of war of the Czechoslovak Legion, attempting to get back to the front, began armed fighting against Bolshevik authorities in May 1918.

As Alexander Rabinowitch notes:

"This...energized the counterrevolution in Petrograd, roiled the Germans, and badly frightened gravely weakened Bolshvik authorities in the former capital. The drift to Red Terror in Petrograd and other Russian cities during the late summer of 1918 grew out of the insecurities caused by these ominous [military] developments. Factors often cited for causing the Terror, such as pressure from Lenin, the assassinations of Volodarsky and Uritsky, and the unsuccessful attempt to assassinate Lenin, played a less significant role."

=== Legacy ===
His friend Anatoly Lunacharsky eulogized Volodarsky in 1923:

Monument to V. Volodarsky in St. Petersburg

"His Red Gazette immediately became a really fighting newspaper, the house-newspaper of the revolution, easily understood by the masses, even more so than Pravda, for all the universality of its appeal.... He wrote as he spoke, with remarkable ease. He never strove after great originality. He aimed his articles as he did his words, like bullets. Nobody, when they fire a volley and attack, bothers whether the bullets are original or not. Yet his bullet-like works, spoken and printed, riddled every obstacle. * * *

He was an absolutely dedicated fighter, ready to go wherever he was needed. There was something of Marat in his ruthlessness, but unlike Marat he sought the light of day: not for him the role of hidden counsellor, of éminence grise. He was, on the contrary, always on view with his aquiline beak and his vigilant stare, always in full voice with that special rasp in his throat, always to be seen in the front row, a target for his enemies, the on-the-spot leader.

So they killed him."

In 1918, the town of Poshekhonye was renamed Poshekhonye-Volodarsk in Volodarsky's honor. It reverted to its original name in 1992. Similarly, the town Volodarsk, located 50 kilometers west of Nizhny Novgorod, was named after him in 1920 and retains its name to this day.

Streets throughout the USSR were also named in his honor, as recorded in a partial list at Russian Wikipedia. Additionally, the Volodarsky Bridge, located near the site of his assassination, was named after him.
