= State Public Historical Library of Russia =

Library in Moscow, Russia

- Государственная публичная историческая библиотека России
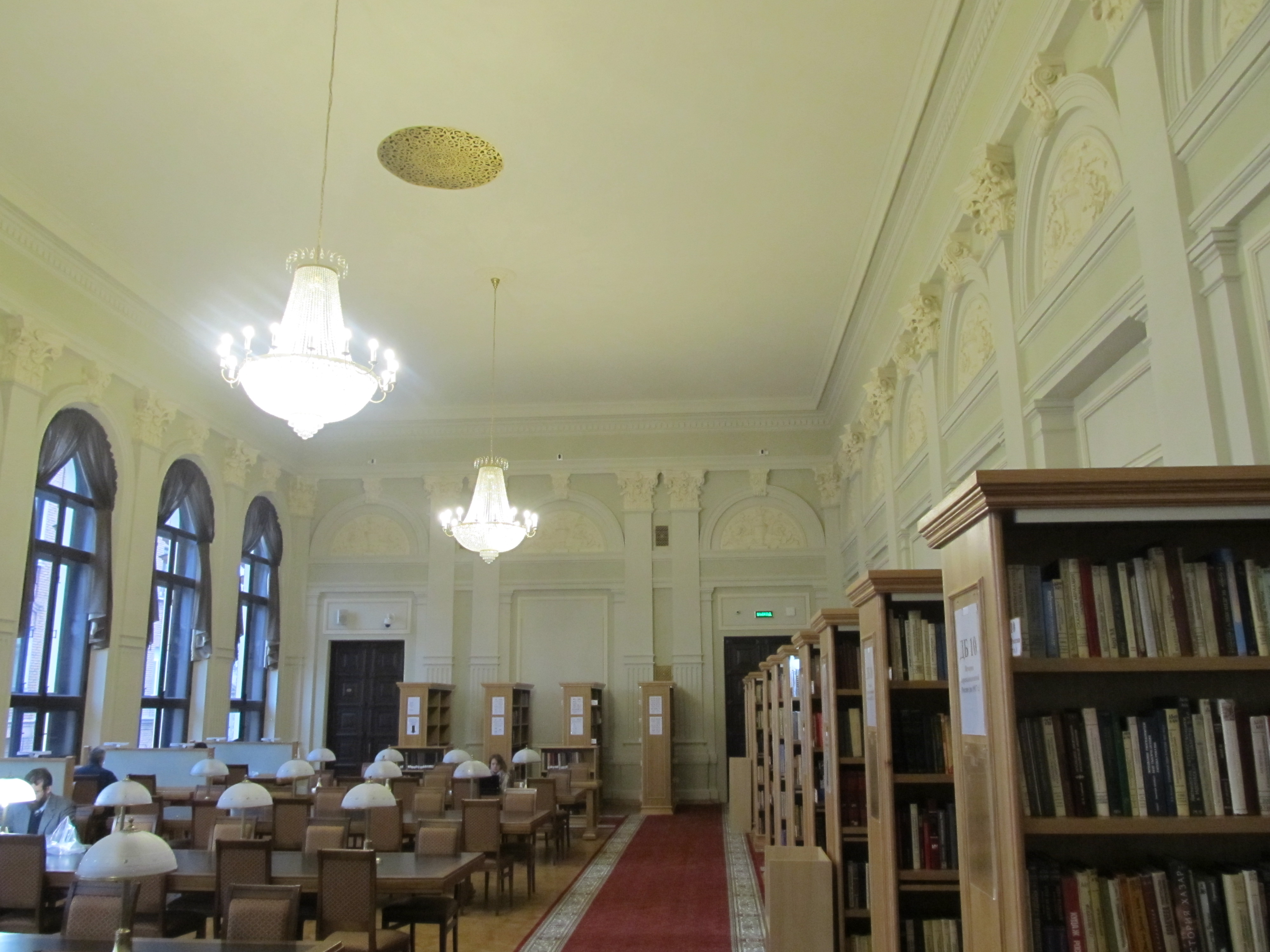
- State Historic Public Library of Russia Main Hall of Historical building
- 55.7561°N 37.6401°E
- Location: Moscow, Russia
- Type: Historical library
- Established: 1938

Other information
- Website: http://www.shpl.ru/

The State Public Historical Library of Russia was founded in 1938 under the Soviet Union as the State Public Historical Library of the Russian Soviet Federative Socialist Republic or State Public Historical Library.

== History ==
The collection and basis of the State Public Historical Library was the private library of a famous Moscow based collector, Alexander Dmitrievich Chertkov who opened up the first public use library in Russia in 1863. The library contained valuable collections of antique and Russian coins, ancient Russian and Egyptian antiquities, painted Etruscan vases and mirrors, natural science collections of minerals, insects, butterflies and herbaria. The collections of this library also became the basis of the State Historical Museum of which it became the library. By March 20, 1938, the museum library had grown and changed significantly so that the Politburo of the Central Committee of the All-Union Communist Party of Bolsheviks passed a resolution for the library to merge with the Joint Library of the Institute of Red Professors and a number of other small libraries to form the State Public Historical Library of the Russian Soviet Federative Socialist Republic.

The Library's functions were defined:

1. to act as the central historical library of the Russian Federation
2. to be a state repository of domestic and foreign historical literature in printed or manuscript form
3. to serve as a research institute in historical bibliography and library science.

By 1970 its collection numbered around 3 million items which included over 30,000 rare historical books. It contained a general reading room and three respective research rooms for the topics of the history of the Soviet Government and the Communist Party, general history, and eastern history.

After the collapse of the Soviet Union the library was renamed to the State Public Historical Library of Russia.

Despite the collapse the role of the Historical Library remained relatively unchanged continuing acting as a repository and information center for historical materials. It now has over 4 million books in its collections in over 65 languages.

== See also ==
- List of libraries in Russia
