= Volodarsk, Russia =

Town in Nizhny Novgorod Oblast, Russia

Volodarsk Володарск
- Town
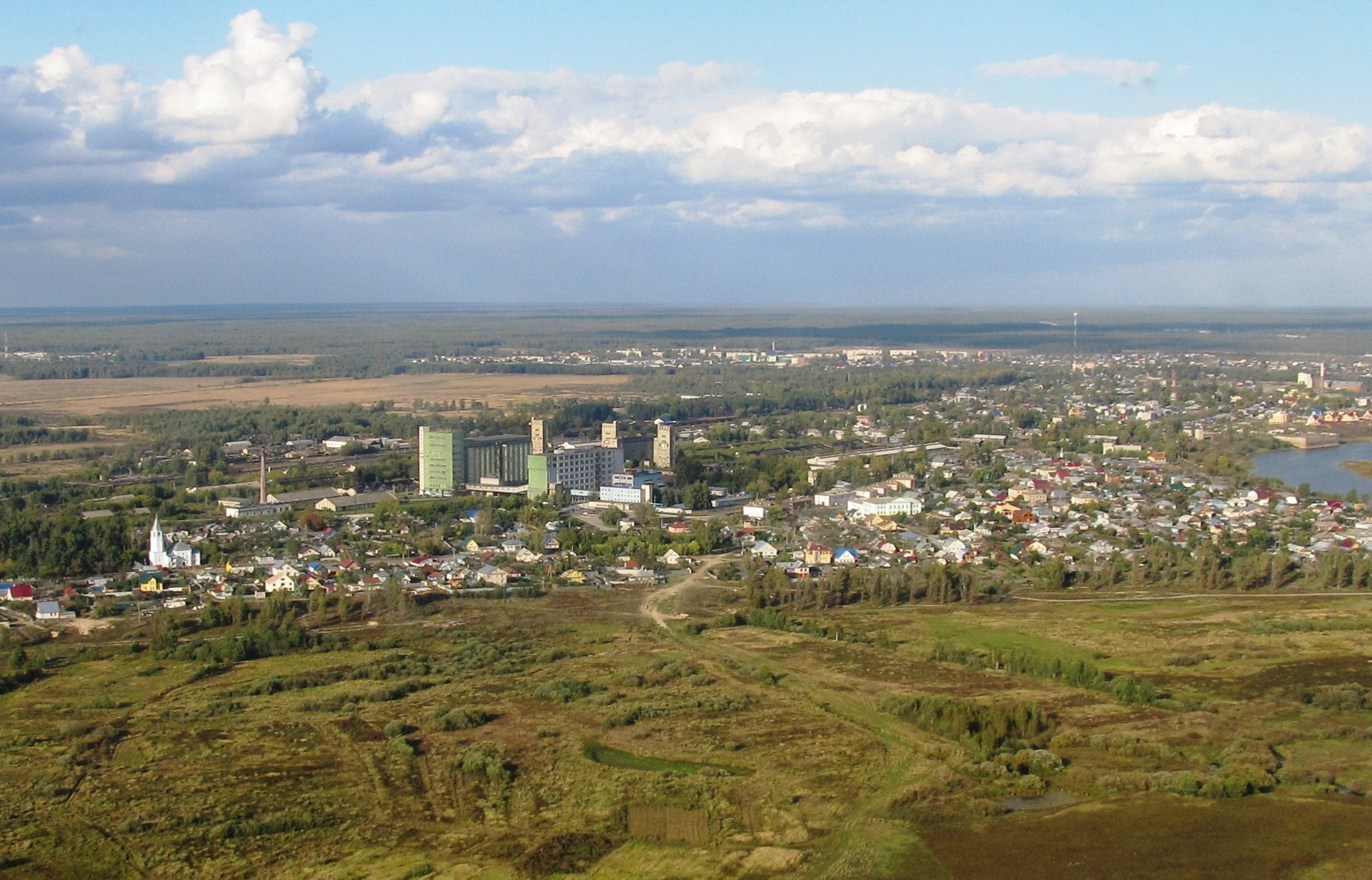
- Aerial view of Volodarsk

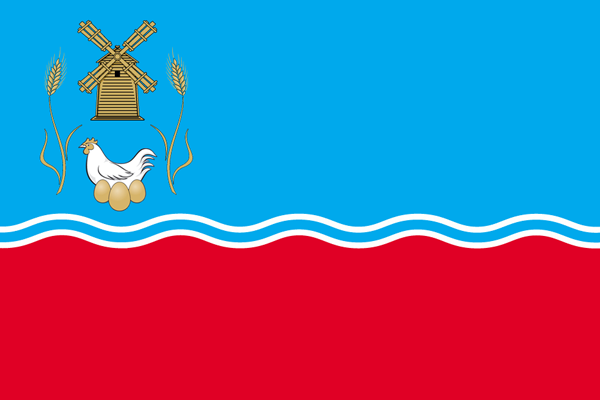
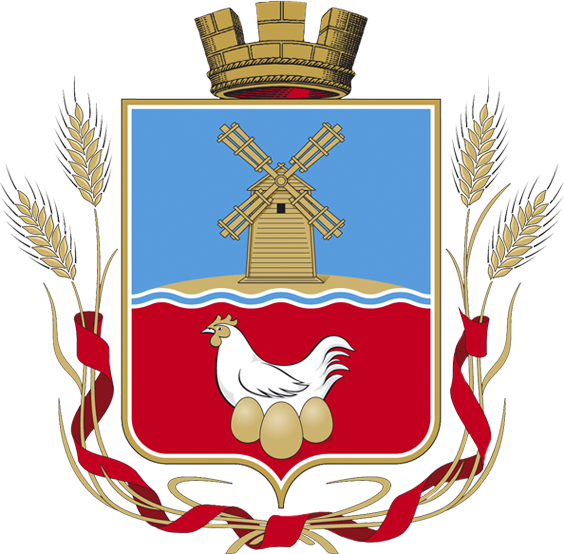
- Flag Coat of arms
- Interactive map of Volodarsk
- Location of Volodarsk Volodarsk (Nizhny Novgorod Oblast)
- Coordinates: 56°13′N 43°11′E
- Country: Russia
- Federal subject: Nizhny Novgorod Oblast
- Administrative district: Volodarsky District
- Town of district significanceSelsoviet: Volodarsk
- Founded: 19th century
- Town status since: 1956
- Elevation: 75 m (246 ft)

Population (2010 Census)
  - Total: 9,928
  - Estimate (2021): 9,705 (−2.2%)

Administrative status
  - Capital of: Volodarsky District, town of district significance of Volodarsk

Municipal status
  - Municipal district: Volodarsky Municipal District
  - Urban settlement: Volodarsk Urban Settlement
  - Capital of: Volodarsky Municipal District, Volodarsk Urban Settlement
- Time zone: UTC+3 (MSK)
- Postal codes: 606070, 606072
- OKTMO ID: 22631103001
- Website: adminvolodarsk-nn.ru

Volodarsk (Russian: Волода́рск) is a town and the administrative center of Volodarsky District in Nizhny Novgorod Oblast, Russia, located on the Seyma River (Oka's tributary) 50 kilometers (31 mi) west of Nizhny Novgorod, the administrative center of the oblast. Population: 9,928 (2010 census); 10,989 (2002 census); 11,034 (1989 Soviet census).

== History ==
The village of Seyma on the Seyma River was first mentioned in the 15th century. Seyma's branch settlement of Olgino was renamed Volodarsk in 1920, after V. Volodarsky, a Russian revolutionary. In 1932, Volodarsk was granted urban-type settlement status, which absorbed the original village of Seyma. Town status was granted to it in 1956.

== Administrative and municipal status ==
Within the framework of administrative divisions, Volodarsk serves as the administrative center of Volodarsky District. As an administrative division, it is incorporated within Volodarsky District as the town of district significance of Volodarsk. As a municipal division, the town of district significance of Volodarsk is incorporated within Volodarsky Municipal District as Volodarsk Urban Settlement.
