= Volodarskoye, Republic of Bashkortostan =

Volodarskoye Володарское
- Village
- Location within Bashkortostan Location within Russia
- Coordinates: 54°45′N 54°32′E
- Country: Russia
- Region: Bashkortostan
- District: Buzdyaksky District
- Time zone: UTC+5:00

Volodarskoye (Russian: Володарское) is a rural locality (a village) in Kilimovsky Selsoviet, Buzdyaksky District, Bashkortostan, Russia. The population was 23 as of 2010. There is 1 street.

== Geography ==
Volodarskoye is located 26 km north of Buzdyak (the district's administrative centre) by road. Sharbash is the nearest rural locality.
