= Leonid Kannegisser =

Russian poet and assassin (1896–1918)

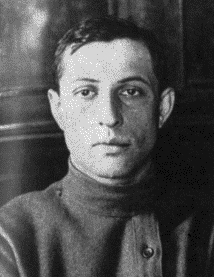
- Kannegisser in 1918
- Born: March 1896; Nikolaev, Russian Empire
- Died: October 1918 (aged 22); Petrograd, Russian SFSR
- Cause of death: Execution by firing squad
- Military career
- Allegiance: Imperial Russian Army
- Branch: Artillery
- Service years: 1913–1918
- Rank: Junker

Leonid Joachimovich (Akimovich) Kannegisser (Russian: Леони́д Иоаки́мович (Аки́мович) Кáннегисер, romanized: Leonid Ioakimovich (Akimovich) Kannegiser; March 1896 – October 1918) was a Russian poet and military cadet, known for assassinating Moisei Uritsky, chief of the Cheka in Petrograd, on 30 August 1918.

== Life and career ==
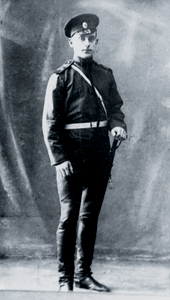
Leonid Kannegisser in cadet uniform

Leonid Kannegisser (also spelled Kanngießer or Kannegiesser) was born in March 1896 in Nikolaev, Ukraine, (then part of the Russian Empire), into a wealthy Jewish family. His father, Akim (Joachim) Kannegisser, was a mechanical engineer and the head of Russia's largest shipyards, the Black Sea Shipyard, and his mother was a doctor. Kannegisser graduated from a private school and in 1913 became a military cadet in the Mikhailov Artillery School of the Imperial Russian Army. Kannegisser studied economics from 1915 to 1917 at the Petrograd Polytechnic Institute and was a member of Popular Socialists, a moderate left-wing anti-bolshevik political party. An admirer of Alexander Kerensky, on the night of 25 to 26 October 1917 (Old Style Julian Calendar), during the October Revolution, Kannegisser and several other cadets defended the Provisional Government at the Winter Palace. In 1917 he dedicated a poem to Alexander Kerensky.

== Uritsky's assassination ==
On 30 August 1918, at around nine o’clock, Kannegisser, wearing a leather jacket and an officers cap, turned up at the People's Commissariat of Internal Affairs, left his bicycle by the door and entered the building. Uritsky arrived in his car at around ten o’clock, and a few moments later he was fatally shot in his head and body by Kannegisser. After shooting Uritsky, he ran out into the street and tried to escape on his bicycle, riding quickly but was chased by a car. He threw away his bicycle and ran into the British embassy. Kannegisser left the embassy after having donned a longcoat, after which he opened fire on Red Guards but he was arrested.

Kannegisser was interrogated. He declared that he had acted alone and was executed shortly afterwards in Petrograd. Following his arrest, the Bolshevik authorities also arrested several members of his family and friends.

=== Motivation ===
Kannegisser was part of a clandestine anti-Bolshevik group led by his cousin, Maximilian Filonenko, who had close links with Boris Savinkov, who gave the order to assassinate Uritsky. Kannegisser's lover, an army officer named Viktor Pereltsveig, had been executed with a group of officers by the Cheka in the summer of 1918. It was Uritsky who signed the execution orders, so Kannegisser decided to take revenge.

== Poetry ==
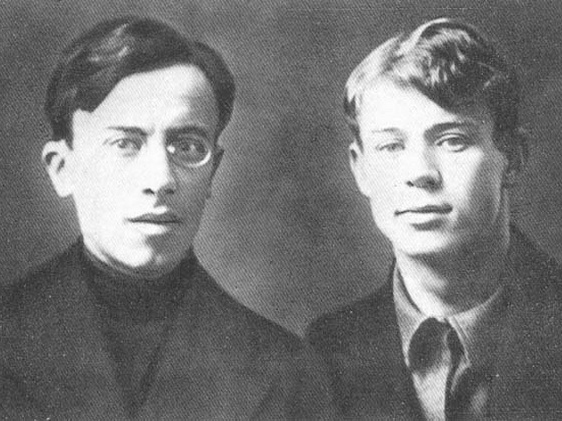
Kannegisser and Yesenin in 1915

From childhood Kannegisser had written poetry and was a friend of Sergei Yesenin. He hosted in his house many literary meetings, where Marina Tsvetaeva, Osip Mandelshtam and others presented their poetry. A decade after Kannegiesser's execution his poems were posthumously published by Mark Aldanov in Paris in 1928. A major part of Kannegisser's literary heritage is preserved in the closed files of the Central Government Archives of Literature and Art in Moscow.
