= Grigory Ivanovich Semyonov =

Soviet Revolutionary (1891–1937)

Grigory Semyonov
- Григорий Семёнов

Personal details
- Born: November 29, 1891 Dorpat, Governorate of Livonia, Russian Empire
- Died: October 8, 1937 (aged 45) Moscow, USSR
- Occupation: Revolutionary, intelligence officer

Grigory Ivanovich Semyonov (Russian: Григорий Иванович Семёнов; 29 November 1891 – 8 October 1937) was a former Socialist Revolutionary (SR) who converted to Bolshevism while imprisoned by them and went on to testify against his erstwhile comrades in the 1922 Moscow Trial of Socialist Revolutionaries.

== Biography ==
Semyonov was a private in the 12th Army. following the February Revolution in 1917, he was elected to the army committee by his regiment and joined the Socialist Revolutionary Party. After the Bolshevik seizure of power and resultant Russian Civil War, Semyonov was a member of the SR Military Commission. However he was concerned that the leadership was ineffectual and advocated – and organised – a terrorist cell, the Central Battle Unit, to combat the Bolsheviks. He was responsible for the murder of V. Volodarsky on 20 June 1918. However following his arrest by the Cheka in the autumn of 1918, he reversed his political alignment and helped provide information which enabled the subsequent show trial of the SR leadership.
