= Moisei Uritsky =

Bolshevik revolutionary (1873–1918)

- Моисей Урицкий
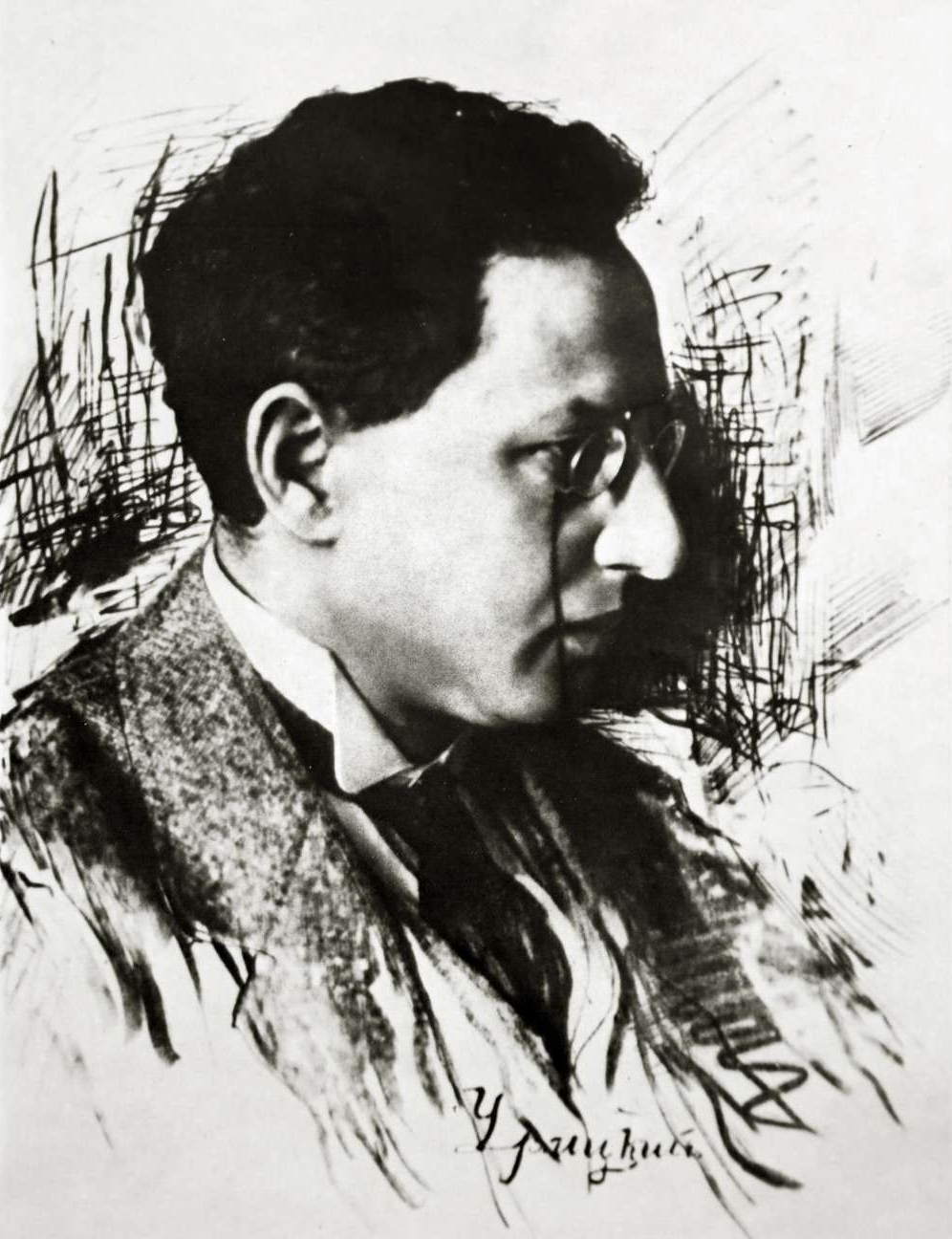
- Portrait by Moisei Nappelbaum, 1918

Chief of Cheka of Petrograd city
- In office 10 March 1918 – 30 August 1918
- Preceded by: Position created
- Succeeded by: Gleb Bokii

People's Commissar of the North Commune

Personal details
- Born: 2 January 1873 Cherkasy, Kiev Governorate, Russian Empire
- Died: 30 August 1918 (aged 45) Petrograd, Russian SFSR
- Party: RSDLP (1898–1903); Mensheviks (1903–1917); RCP (1917–1918)
- Education: St. Vladimir Imperial University of Kiev (1897)
- Occupation: Chekist, political activist, and politician
- Profession: Lawyer

Moisei Solomonovich Uritsky (Ukrainian: Мойсей Соломонович Урицький; Russian: Моисей Соломонович Урицкий; 2 January 1873 [O.S. 21 December 1872] – 30 August 1918), also known by his pen-name Boretsky (Russian: Борецкий), was a Bolshevik revolutionary leader in Russia. After the October Revolution, he was the head of the Petrograd Cheka from January 1918 until his death on 30 August 1918. Uritsky was assassinated by Leonid Kannegisser, a military cadet, who was executed shortly afterwards.

== Early life ==
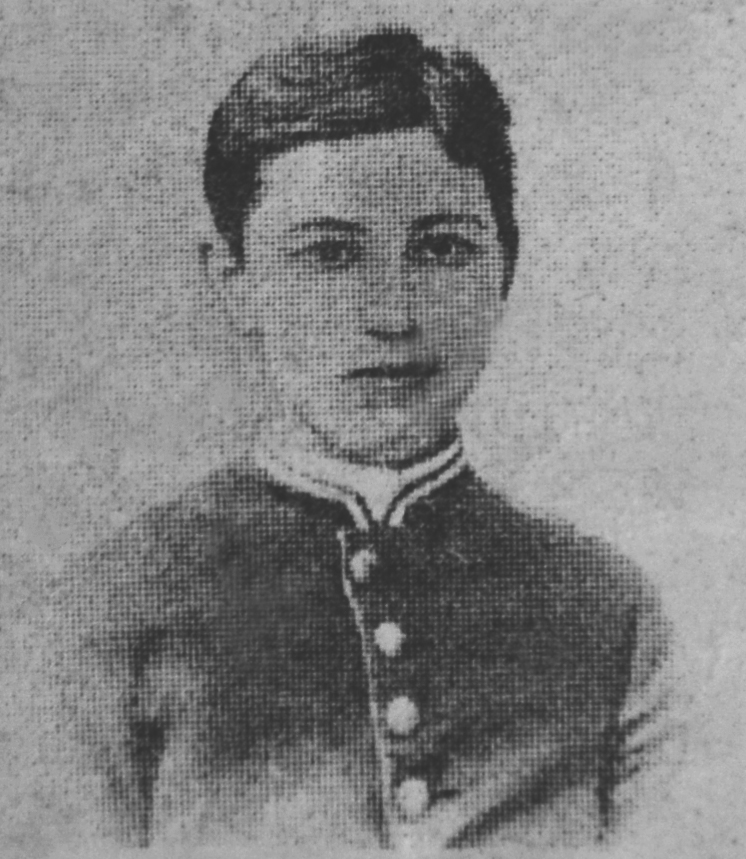
Moisei Uritsky student at Bila Tserkva gymnasium circa 1883

Uritsky was born in the city of Cherkasy, then part of the Kiev Governorate, to a Litvak family. His father, a merchant, died when Moisei was little and his mother raised her son by herself. He attended the Bila Tserkva Gymnasium, supporting himself through teaching and became an active social democrat.

== Early political career ==
Moisei Uritsky studied law at the St. Vladimir Imperial University of Kiev. During his studies he joined the Russian Social Democratic Labour Party and organized an underground network for importing and distributing political literature. In 1897, he was arrested and exiled for running an illegal mimeograph press. Becoming involved in the revolutionary movement, he participated in the revolutionary Jewish Bund. In 1903, he became a Menshevik. His activities in St Petersburg during the 1905 Revolution earned him a second term of exile. Along with Alexander Parvus, he was active in dispatching revolutionary agents to infiltrate the Imperial security apparatus.

== Russian Revolution ==
In 1914, he emigrated to France and contributed to the Party newspaper Our Word edited by Leon Trotsky. Back in Russia after the February Revolution of 1917, Uritsky became a member of the Mezhraiontsy group. A few months before the October Revolution, he joined the Bolsheviks and was elected to their Central Committee in July 1917. Uritsky played a leading role in the Bolsheviks' armed take-over in October as a member of the Petrograd Military Revolutionary Committee, and was later made head of the Petrograd Cheka secret police in January 1918.

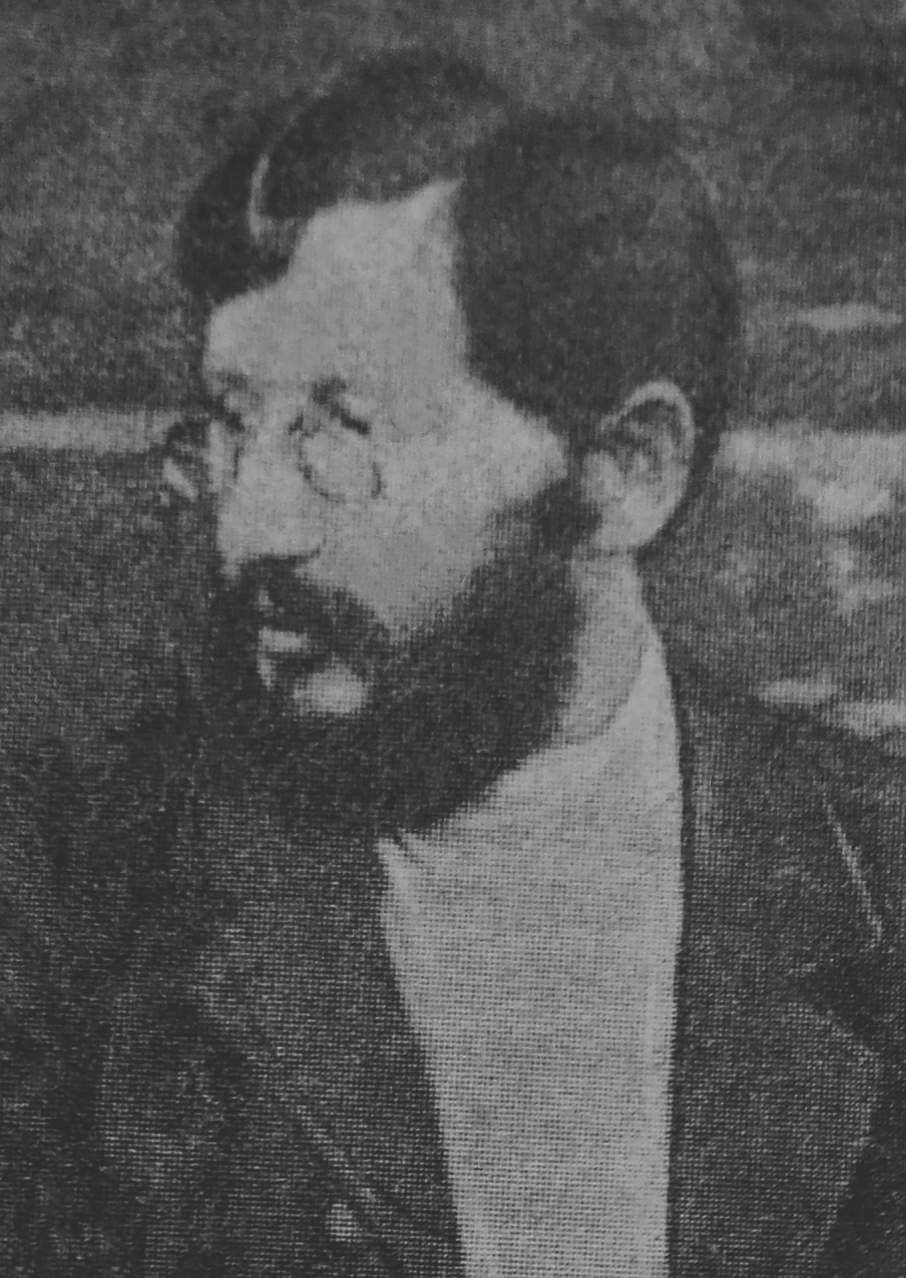
Moisei Uritsky's internal exile in Arkhangelsk Governorate, circa 1906

Because Uritsky was against Lenin's Treaty of Brest-Litovsk, he resigned his post in 1918, like Bukharin, Bubnov, Piatakov, Dzerzhinsky and Smirnov. On 4 March 1918, the Petrograd committee published the first number of the journal Kommunist, the public organ of the "left communist" opposition, as directed by Radek and Uritsky. The Extraordinary Seventh Congress of the Russian Communist Party (Bolsheviks), which was held between 6 and 8 March 1918, rejected the Theses on the Present Situation that was submitted as a resolution by the "Left Communists". The "Left Communists" Lomov and Uritsky, who were elected to the Central Committee, stated at the Congress that they would not work in the Central Committee, and did not begin work there for several months in spite of insistent demands from the Central Committee.

On 25 May 1918, with the Revolt of the Czechoslovak Legion, the Russian Civil War began and Uritsky resumed his position on the Central Committee. An opponent of the death penalty, he nevertheless signed execution warrants approved by his Committee.

== Assassination ==
Leonid Kannegisser, a young military cadet of the Imperial Russian Army, assassinated Uritsky on 30 August [O.S. 17 August] 1918, outside the Petrograd Cheka headquarters; he carried out the killing in retaliation for the execution of his friend and of other officers. Following this event and the assassination attempt on Lenin by Socialist Revolutionary Fanny Kaplan on 30 August, the Bolsheviks began a wave of persecution known as the Red Terror.

The Communist Party buried Uritsky with honours on the Field of Mars in Petrograd on 2 September 1918. All the leaders of the Communist Party followed Uritsky's coffin to the grave. Zinoviev delivered the funeral oration, and the guns of the Tsarist fortress of Petropavlovsk fired the last salute.

== Commemoration ==
Palace Square in Petrograd became Uritsky Square from 1918 to 1944. Many "Uritsky Streets" still remain in Russia.

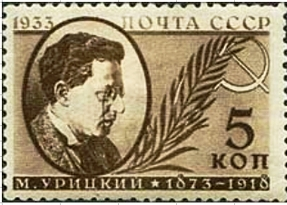
Uritsky on a 1933 Soviet stamp

In the Soviet Navy, the destroyer Zabiyaka bore the name Uritsky from 1922 to 1951.

== See also ==
- Outline of the Russian Revolution and Civil War
- Bibliography of the Russian Revolution and Civil War
- Bibliography of Stalinism and the Soviet Union
- Index of Old Bolsheviks
- Index of articles related to the Russian Revolution and Civil War
