= Volodarsk =

Volodarsk may refer to:

- Volodarsk Urban Settlement, a municipal formation which the town of district significance of Volodarsk in Volodarsky District of Nizhny Novgorod Oblast, Russia is incorporated as
- Volodarsk, Russia, a town in Volodarsky District of Nizhny Novgorod Oblast, Russia
- Volodarsk, Ukraine
- Volodarsk-Volynskyi, former name of Khoroshiv, an urban-type settlement in Zhytomyr Oblast, Ukraine
- Poshekhonye-Volodarsk, name of the town of Poshekhonye in 1918–1992
