= Red Terror =

Bolshevik campaign of political repression and executions (1918–1922)

- Part of the Russian Civil War
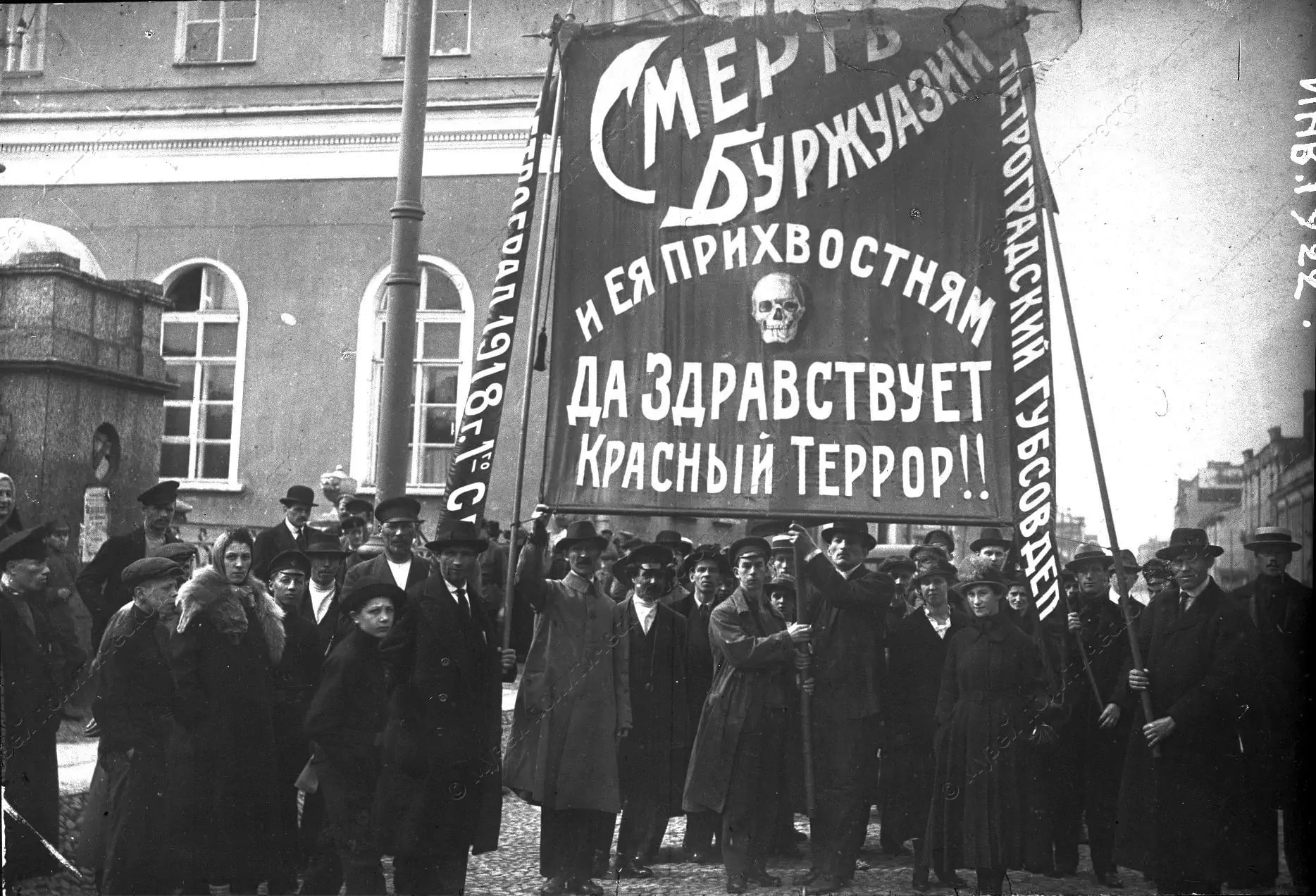
- Propaganda poster in Petrograd, 1918: "Death to the bourgeoisie and its lapdogs – Long live the Red Terror!!" (Note: The orthography used on the poster is generally in line with the 1918 Bolshevik reform except for ея, a pre-revolutionary form of её (female pronoun).)
- Native name: Красный террор (post-1918 orthography); Красный терроръ (pre-1918 orthography)
- Date: August 1918 – February 1922
- Location: Soviet Russia, Soviet Ukraine and other locations
- Motive: Political repression
- Target: Anti-Bolshevik groups, clergy, rival socialists, counter-revolutionaries, peasants, and dissidents
- Organized by: Cheka
- Deaths: Mainstream estimates range between 50,000 and 600,000 (see below)

The Red Terror (Russian: красный террор, romanized: krasnyy terror) was a campaign of political repression and mass executions in Soviet Russia and other Soviet republics, which was carried out by the Bolsheviks during the Russian Civil War, chiefly through the Cheka, the Bolshevik secret police force. It officially started in early September 1918 and it lasted until 1922, though violence committed by Bolshevik soldiers, sailors, and Red Guards had been ongoing since late 1917.

Decreed after assassination attempts on Vladimir Lenin along with the successful assassinations of Petrograd Cheka leader Moisei Uritsky and party editor V. Volodarsky in retaliation for Bolshevik mass repressions, the Red Terror was modeled on the Reign of Terror of the French Revolution, and the Paris Commune. The policy sought to eliminate political dissent, opposition, and any other threat to Bolshevik power.

More broadly, the term can be applied to Bolshevik political repression throughout the Russian Civil War (1917–1922). Bolshevik leader Leon Trotsky attempted to justify the repressive measures as a necessary response to the White Terror initiated in 1917.

== History ==
=== Background ===
When the October Revolution took power in November 1917, many top Bolsheviks hoped to avoid much of the violence which would come to define this period. Through one of its first decrees on 8 November 1917, the Second All-Russian Congress of Soviets of Workers' and Soldiers' Deputies abolished the death penalty. It had first been canceled by the February Revolution and then restored by the Kerensky's government. Not a single death sentence was issued in the first three months of Vladimir Lenin's government, which consisted of a coalition with the Left Socialist-Revolutionaries, who, albeit terrorists in the tsarist era, were staunch opponents of the death penalty. However, as pressure mounted from the White Armies and from international intervention, the Bolsheviks moved closer to Lenin's harsher perspective.

The Bolsheviks had employed terror before the official declaration of September 5, 1918. This early phase of the terror was mainly carried out by sailors, soldiers, and Red Guards. Their methods included confiscations, fines, executions, and hostage-taking. On January 14, 1918, Bolshevik sailors from the Black Sea Fleet killed some 300 victims at Yevpatoriya by breaking their limbs and throwing them from the steamship Romania.

Targets at the early period of violence were chiefly officers, cadets, and 'bourgeois'. In mid-January in Odessa sailors killed officers and junkers (officer cadets) by throwing them from the Russian cruiser Almaz. According to another account a colonel was roasted alive within the engine of a locomotive.

Several unsanctioned incidents of mob violence were perpetrated by civilian supporters of the Bolsheviks. Shortly after the Bolshevik takeover of Rostov in November 1917, workers in Taganrog surrounded fifty officer cadets, who surrendered on the understanding that their lives were to be spared. They were taken to a metal factory and thrown one at a time into the blast furnace.

Several prominent figures also fell victim to this phase of violence. On November 20 (December 3), 1917, General Nikolai Dukhonin surrendered himself to the Bolshevik Krylenko in Mogilev. Despite Krylenko's efforts to defend the general, Dukhonin was lynched by a mob of Bolshevik sailors from the Baltic Fleet.

The decision to enact the Red Terror was also driven by the initial "massacre of their 'Red' prisoners by the office-cadres during the Moscow insurrection of October 1917", allied intervention in the Russian Civil War, and the large-scale massacres of Reds during the Finnish Civil War in which 10,000 to 20,000 revolutionaries had been killed by the Finnish Whites.

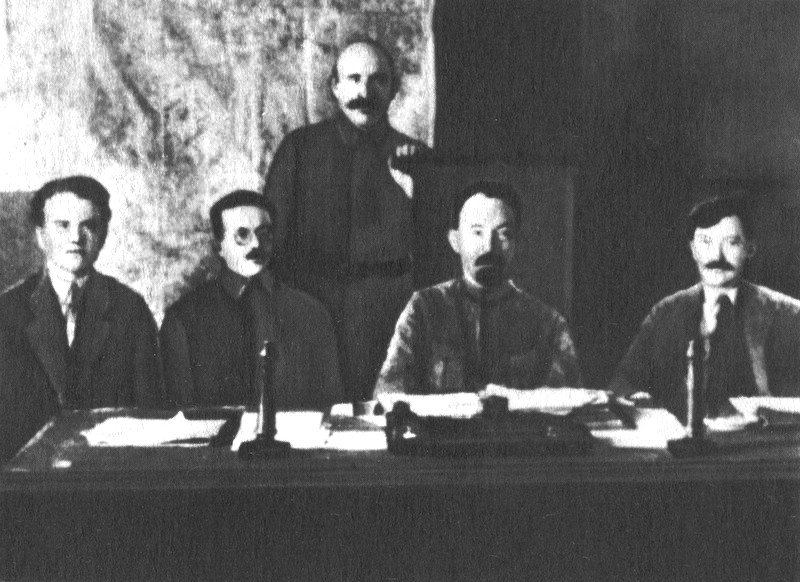
Members of the presidium of VCheKa (left to right) Yakov Peters, Józef Unszlicht, Abram Belenky (standing), Felix Dzerzhinsky, Vyacheslav Menzhinsky, 1921

In December 1917, Felix Dzerzhinsky was appointed to the duty of rooting out counterrevolutionary threats to the Soviet government. He was the director of the All-Russian Extraordinary Commission (aka Cheka), a predecessor of the KGB that served as the secret police for the Soviets.

An early example of terrorist policies executed by Bolshevik-controlled military forces were the mass murders perpetrated by troops of Mikhail Muravyov, representing the Communist government of Eugenia Bosch during the occupation of Kyiv in January–March 1918.

On 21 February 1918, the death penalty was also formally re-established, as an exceptional revolutionary instrument, with the famous decree Socialist Homeland is in Danger!. In article 8, it read as follows: "Enemy agents, profiteers, marauders, hooligans, counter-revolutionary agitators and German spies are to be shot on the spot".

Starting around April 1918, Russian anarchists were among the first revolutionary socialist victims of the precursors of Red Terror. Anarchists harshly criticized Bolsheviks' centralization of political power by creating the Bolshevik-dominated Council of People's Commissars (Sovnarkom), nationalizing the land, subordinating the factory committees to the state-controlled network of trade unions, and creating the secret police organization Cheka; later, anarchists widely opposed the Declaration of the Rights of the Peoples of Russia and the Treaty of Brest-Litovsk as betrayals of revolutionary internationalism and the stateless ideal. Some militant Bakuninist anarchists even advocated armed struggle against the dictatorship. Meanwhile, Bolsheviks associated violent anti-Bolshevik rhetoric and such crimes as robberies, expropriations, and murders committed by nominally anarchist criminals with all anarchists and perceived the increasingly militant and resistant anarchists as legitimate threat. Subsequently, the Sovnarkom decided to liquidate anarchist-associated criminal recklessness and disarm and disband all anarchist organizations. In Moscow and Petrograd the Cheka largely succeeded in disbanding all anarchist organizations; particularly, on 12 April 1918, the Cheka raided 26 anarchist centres in Moscow, including the Moscow Federation of Anarchist Groups' headquarters, namely House of Anarchy. In almost all cases the anarchists surrendered without a fight, yet in the Donskoi Monastery and at the House of Anarchy the anarchists fiercely resisted the Cheka; as a result a dozen Chekists were killed while 40 anarchists were killed or wounded, and approximately 500 more were imprisoned.

In 1922, anarchist activists Alexander Berkman and Emma Goldman recounted the Cheka raid against anarchists in April 1918 thus:

Of all the revolutionary elements in Russia it is the Anarchists who now suffer the most ruthless and systematic persecution. Their suppression by the Bolsheviki began already in 1918, when – in the month of April of that year – the Communist Government attacked, without provocation or warning, the Anarchist Club of Moscow and by the use of machine guns and artillery "liquidated" the whole organisation. It was the beginning of Anarchist hounding, but it was sporadic in character, breaking out now and then, quite planless, and frequently self-contradictory.

— Alexander Berkman, Emma Goldman, "Bolsheviks Shooting Anarchists"

Later, Goldman acknowledged many anarchists' opposition the Treaty of Brest-Litovsk, yet drew no causal link between such opposition and later persecutions of anarchists by Bolsheviks.

On 16 June 1918, more than two months prior to the events that would officially catalyze the Terror, a new decree re-established the death penalty as an ordinary jurisdictional measure by instructing the Revolutionary People's Courts to use it "as the only punishment for counter-revolutionary offences".

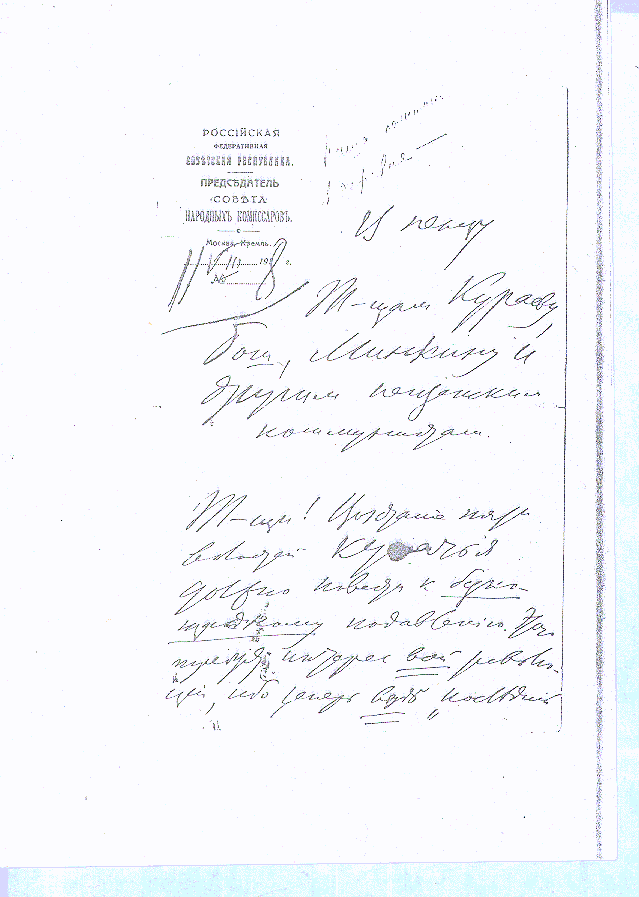
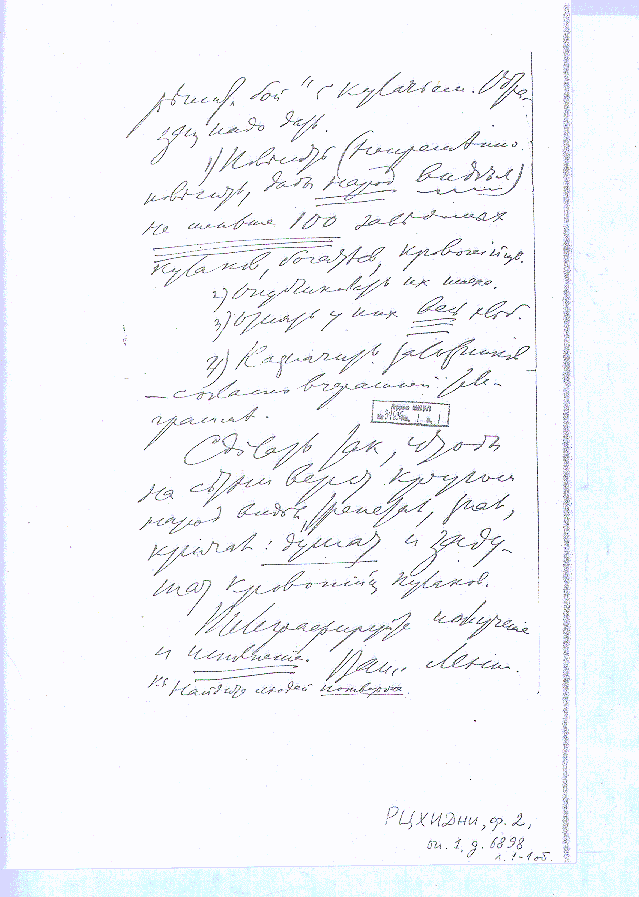
The first and second pages of the so-called "Lenin's Hanging Order" concerning a peasant revolt in Penza governorate; the "order" was not carried out as such

Also prior to the events that would officially catalyze the Terror, Lenin issued orders and made speeches which included harsh expressions and descriptions of brutal measures to be taken against the "class enemies", which, however, often were not actual orders or were not carried out as such. For example, in a telegram, which became known as "Lenin's hanging order", he demanded to "crush" landowners in Penza and to publicly hang "at least 100 kulaks, rich bastards, and known bloodsuckers" in response to a peasant revolt there; yet, only the 13 organizers of the murder of local authorities and the uprising were arrested, while the uprising was ended with a number of propaganda activities. In 1920, having received information that in Estonia and Latvia, with which Soviet Russia had concluded peace treaties, volunteers were being enrolled in anti-Bolshevik detachments, Lenin offered to "advance by 10–20 miles (versts) and hang kulaks, priests, landowners" "while pretending to be greens", but instead, Lenin's government confined itself to sending diplomatic notes.

The Bolsheviks also used terror as a means to dissuade unrest. On August 20, 1918 Lenin wrote to Nikolai Semashko, "I congratulate you on your energetic suppression of the kulaks and White Guards in the district. We must strike while the iron's hot and not lose a minute, organize the poor of the district, confiscate all the grain and all the property of the rebellious kulaks, hang the kulak ringleaders, mobilize and arm the poor under reliable leaders out of our own unit, arrest hostages from among the wealthy and hold them."

Lenin had justified the state response to the kulak revolts due to the preceding 258 uprisings that had occurred in 1918 and the threat of the White Terror. He summarised his view that either the "kulaks massacre vast numbers of workers, or the workers ruthlessly suppress the revolt of the predatory kulak minority... There can be no middle course".

=== Beginnings ===
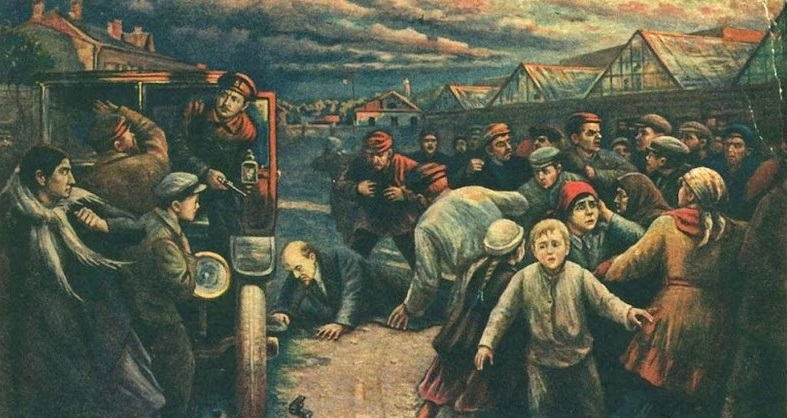
Vladimir Pchelin's 1927 depiction of Fanny Kaplan's assassination attempt on Vladimir Lenin

On August 30, 1918, Leonid Kannegisser, a young military cadet of the Imperial Russian Army, assassinated Moisei Uritsky, the head of the Petrograd Cheka, outside the Petrograd Cheka headquarters in retaliation for the execution of his friend and other officers.

On the same day, August 30, 1918, Socialist Revolutionary Fanny Kaplan unsuccessfully attempted to assassinate Vladimir Lenin.

During interrogation by the Cheka, she made the following statement:

"My name is Fanya Kaplan. Today I shot Lenin. I did it on my own. I will not say from whom I obtained my revolver. I will give no details. I had resolved to kill Lenin long ago. I consider him a traitor to the Revolution. I was exiled to Akatui for participating in an assassination attempt against a Tsarist official in Kiev. I spent 11 years at hard labour. After the Revolution, I was freed. I favoured the Constituent Assembly and am still for it".

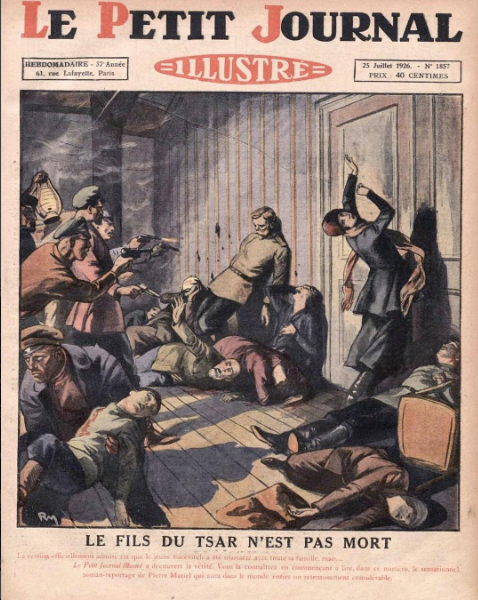
Murder of the Romanov family in 1918, Le Petit Journal

Kaplan referenced the Bolsheviks' growing authoritarianism, citing their forcible shutdown of the Constituent Assembly in January 1918, the elections to which they had lost. When it became clear that Kaplan would not implicate any accomplices, she was executed in Alexander Garden, near the western walls of the Kremlin. "Most sources indicate that Kaplan was executed on 3 September, the day after her transfer to the Kremlin". In 1958 the commander of the Kremlin, the former Baltic sailor Pavel Dmitriyevich Malkov (1887–1965) revealed he had personally executed Kaplan on that date upon the specific orders of Yakov Sverdlov, chief secretary of the Bolshevik Central Committee. She was killed with a bullet to the back of the head. Her corpse was bundled into a barrel and set alight so that her "remains [might] be destroyed without a trace", as Sverdlov had instructed.

These events persuaded the government to heed Dzerzhinsky's lobbying for greater terror against opposition. The campaign of mass repressions would officially begin thereafter. The Red Terror is considered to have officially begun between 30 August and 12 September 1918.

=== Implementation ===
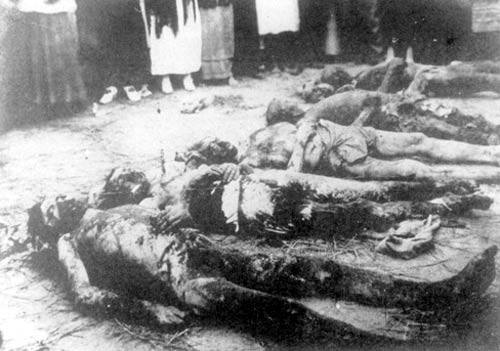
Corpses of hostages executed by Cheka in 1918 in the basement of Tulpanov's house in Kherson, Ukrainian SSR, The Black Book of Communism

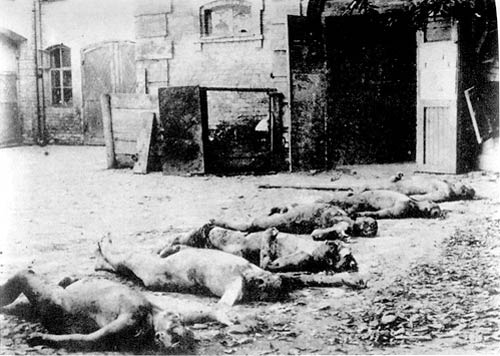
Naked corpses of people executed by Cheka in 1918 at a yard in Kharkiv, Ukrainian SSR, The Black Book of Communism

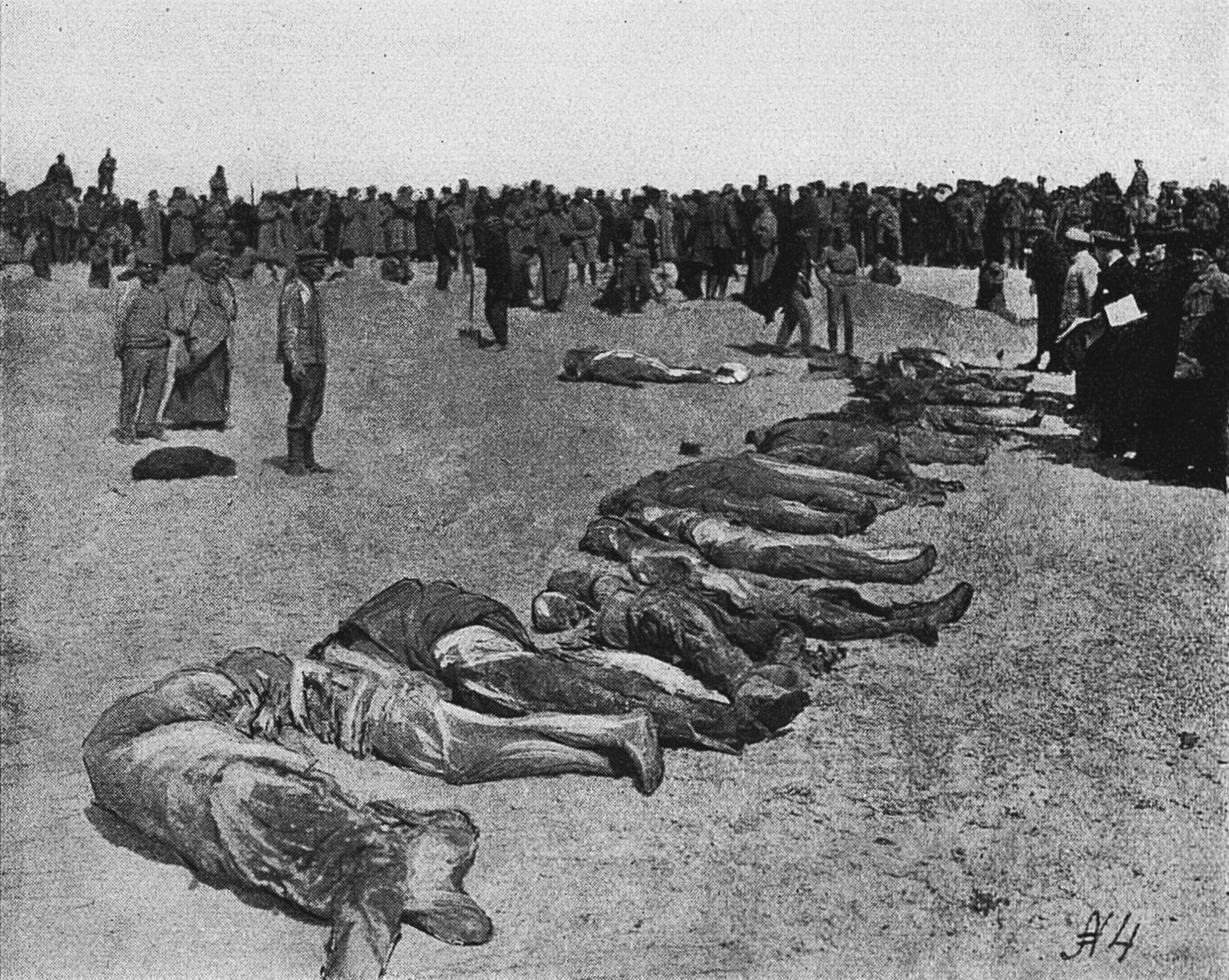
Corpses of victims of the winter 1918 Red Terror in Yevpatoria dumped in the Black Sea by their Bolshevik executioners, but washed ashore by tides and waves in summer days of 1919. The victims of this terror were later memorialized.

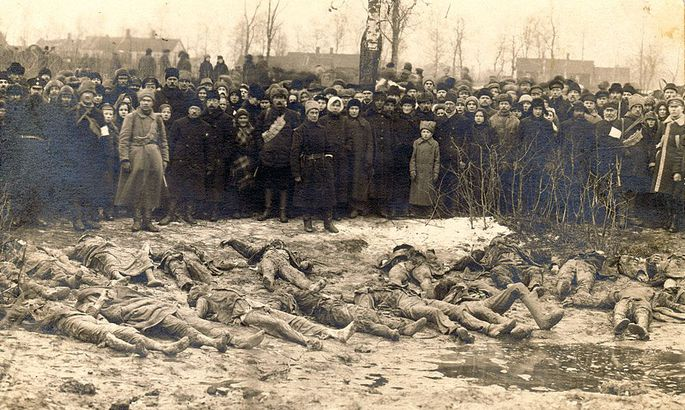
Corpses of victims of the Palermo Forest Massacre. The massacre was carried out by the Bolsheviks in late 1918 and early 1919 in the occupied Rakvere, Estonia.

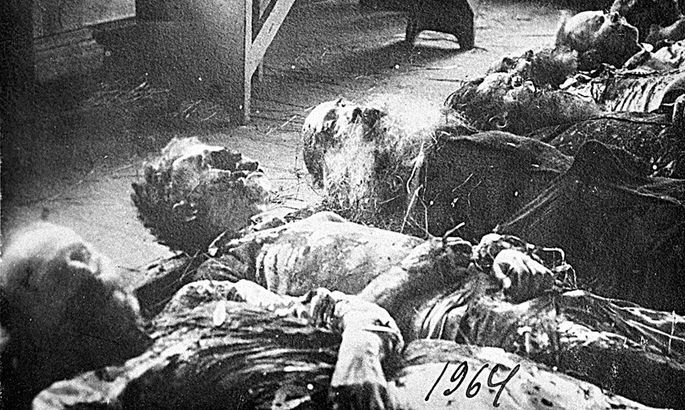
Corpses of victims of the 1919 Tartu Credit Center Massacre killed by the retreating Bolsheviks

While recovering from his wounds, Lenin instructed: "It is necessary – secretly and urgently to prepare the terror." In immediate response to the two attacks, Chekists killed approximately 1,300 "bourgeois hostages" held in Petrograd and Kronstadt prisons.

Bolshevik newspapers were especially integral to instigating an escalation in state violence: on August 31, the state-controlled media launched the repressive campaign through incitement of violence. One article appearing in Pravda exclaimed: "the time has come for us to crush the bourgeoisie or be crushed by it.... The anthem of the working class will be a song of hatred and revenge!" The next day, the newspaper Krasnaia Gazeta stated that "only rivers of blood can atone for the blood of Lenin and Uritsky."

The first official announcement of a Red Terror was published in Izvestia on September 3, titled "Appeal to the Working Class": it had been drafted by Dzerzhinsky and his assistant Jēkabs Peterss and called for the workers to "crush the hydra of counter-revolution with massive terror!"; it would also make clear that "anyone who dares to spread the slightest rumor against the Soviet regime will be arrested immediately and sent to a concentration camp". Izvestia also reported that, in the 4 days since the attempt on Lenin, over 500 hostages had been executed in Petrograd alone.

Subsequently, on September 5, the Council of People's Commissars issued a decree "On Red Terror", prescribing "mass shooting" to be "inflicted without hesitation". The decree ordered the Cheka "to secure the Soviet Republic from the class enemies by isolating them in concentration camps", as well as stating that counter-revolutionaries "must be executed by shooting [and] that the names of the executed and the reasons of the execution must be made public."

According to official numbers, the Bolsheviks executed 500 "representatives of overthrown classes" (kulaks) immediately after the assassination of Uritsky. Soviet commissar Grigory Petrovsky called for an expansion of the Terror and an "immediate end of looseness and tenderness."

In October 1918, Cheka commander Martin Latsis likened the Red Terror to a class war, explaining that "we are destroying the bourgeoisie as a class."

On October 15, the leading Chekist Gleb Bokii, summing up the officially-ended Red Terror, reported that, in Petrograd, 800 alleged enemies had been shot and another 6,229 imprisoned. Casualties in the first two months were between 10,000 and 15,000 based on lists of summarily executed people published in newspaper Cheka Weekly and other official press. A declaration About the Red Terror by the Sovnarkom on 5 September 1918 stated:

...that for empowering the All-Russian Extraordinary Commission in the fight with the counter-revolution, profiteering and corruption and making it more methodical, it is necessary to direct there possibly bigger number of the responsible party comrades, that it is necessary to secure the Soviet Republic from the class enemies by way of isolating them in concentration camps, that all people are to be executed by fire squad who are connected with the White Guard organizations, conspiracies and mutinies, that it is necessary to publicize the names of the executed as well as the reasons of applying to them that measure.

— Signed by People's Commissar of Justice D. Kursky, People's Commissar of Interior G. Petrovsky, Director in Affairs of the Council of People's Commissars V. Bonch-Bruyevich, SU, #19, department 1, art.710, 04.09.1918

As the Russian Civil War progressed, significant numbers of prisoners, suspects and hostages were executed because they belonged to the "possessing classes". Numbers are recorded for cities occupied by the Bolsheviks:

In Kharkov there were between 2,000 and 3,000 executions in February–June 1919, and another 1,000–2,000 when the town was taken again in December of that year; in Rostov-on-Don, approximately 1,000 in January 1920; in Odessa, 2,200 in May–August 1919, then 1,500–3,000 between February 1920 and February 1921; in Kiev, at least 3,000 in February–August 1919; in Ekaterinodar, at least 3,000 between August 1920 and February 1921; In Armavir, a small town in Kuban, between 2,000 and 3,000 in August–October 1920. The list could go on and on.

In Crimea, Béla Kun and Rosalia Zemlyachka, with Lenin's approval, had 50,000 White prisoners of war and civilians summarily executed by shooting or hanging after the defeat of general Pyotr Wrangel at the end of 1920. They had been promised amnesty if they would surrender. This is one of the largest massacres in the Civil War. The figures related to the massacre in Crimea remain contested. Anarchist and Bolshevik Victor Serge gave a lower figure for White officers around 13,000 which he claims were exaggerated. Yet, he condemned Kun for his treacherous actions towards allied anarchists and surrendering whites. According to social scientist, Nikolay Zayats, from the National Academy of Sciences of Belarus the large, “fantastic” estimates derived from eyewitness accounts and White army emigre press. A Crimean Cheka report in 1921 showed that 441 people were shot with a modern estimation that 5,000–12,000 people in total were executed in Crimea.

At the same time, Lenin took measures even at the peak of the civil war to prevent the abuse of power by the Cheka. The case of Mrs. Pershikova may be symbolic: in 1919, she was arrested for defacing a picture-portrait of Lenin, but Lenin ordered to liberate her:

8 March 1919, Myshkin, Chairman of the Gubernia Extraordinary

Commission, Tsaritsyn. You cannot arrest people for disfiguring a portrait. Free Valentina Pershikova at once, and if she is a counterrevolutionary,

keep an eye on her.

Kamenev says-and declares that several most prominent Cheka men confirm it-that the Chekas in the Ukraine have brought a host of evils, having been set up too early and having allowed a mass of hangers-on to get in .... It is necessary at all costs to discipline the Cheka men and throw out the alien elements.

On 16 March 1919, all military detachments of the Cheka were combined in a single body, the Troops for the Internal Defense of the Republic (a branch of the Cheka), which numbered at least 200,000 in 1921. These troops policed labor camps, ran the Gulag system, conducted prodrazverstka (requisitions of food from peasants), and put down peasant rebellions, riots by workers, and mutinies in the Red Army (which was plagued by desertions).

One of the main organizers of the Red Terror for the Bolshevik government was 2nd-Grade Army Commissar Yan Karlovich Berzin (1889–1938), whose real name was Pēteris Ķuzis. He took part in the October Revolution of 1917 and afterwards worked in the central apparatus of the Cheka. During the Red Terror, Berzin initiated the system of taking and shooting hostages to stop desertions and other "acts of disloyalty and sabotage". As chief of a special department of the Latvian Red Army (later the Russian 15th Army), Berzin played a part in the suppression of the Red sailors' uprising at Kronstadt in March 1921. He particularly distinguished himself in the course of the pursuit, capture, and killing of captured sailors.

== Affected groups ==
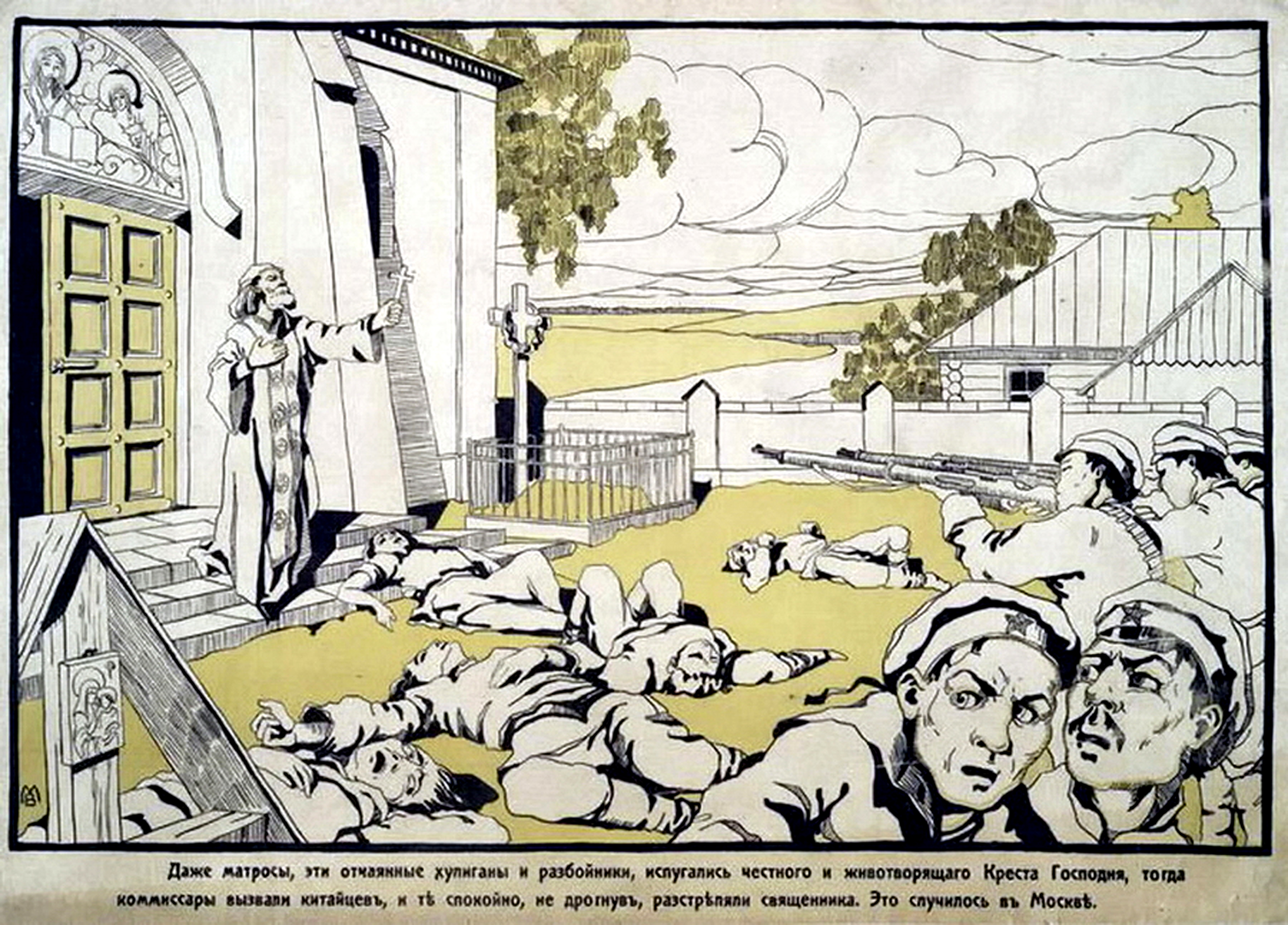
Chinese Chekists executing an Orthodox priest in Moscow, White Russian anti-Bolshevik propaganda poster, c. 1920

Among the victims of the Red Terror were tsarists, liberals, non-Bolshevik socialists, anarchists, members of the clergy, ordinary criminals, counter-revolutionaries, and other political dissidents. Later, industrial workers who failed to meet production quotas were also targeted.

The first victims of the Terror were the Socialist Revolutionaries (SR). Over the months of the campaign, over 800 SR members were executed, while thousands more were driven into exile or detained in labor camps. In a matter of weeks, executions carried out by the Cheka doubled or tripled the number of death sentences pronounced by the Russian Empire over the 92-year period from 1825 to 1917. While the Socialist Revolutionaries were initially the primary targets of the terror, most of its direct victims were associated with the preceding regimes.

=== Peasants ===
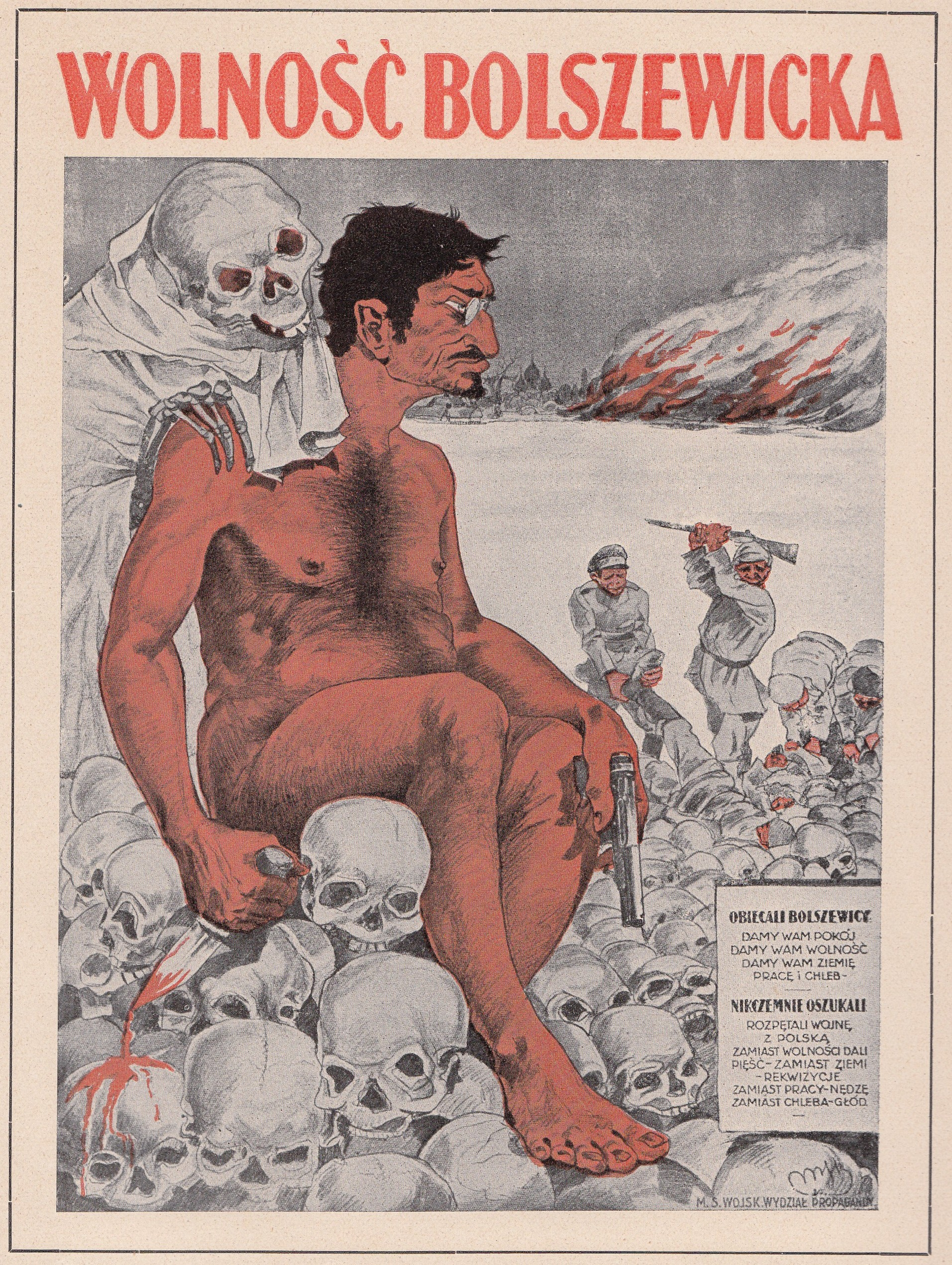
Trotsky on an anti-Soviet Polish poster titled "Bolshevik freedom" which depicts him on a pile of skulls and holding a bloody knife, during the Polish–Soviet War of 1920. Small caption in the lower right corner reads: The Bolsheviks promised: We'll give you peace We'll give you freedom We'll give you land Work and bread Despicably they cheated They started a war With Poland Instead of freedom they brought The fist Instead of land – confiscation Instead of work – misery Instead of bread – famine.

The Internal Troops of the Cheka and the Red Army practiced the terror tactics of taking and executing numerous hostages, often in connection with desertions of forcefully mobilized peasants. According to Orlando Figes, more than 1 million people deserted from the Red Army in 1918, around 2 million people deserted in 1919, and almost 4 million deserters escaped from the Red Army in 1921. According to Nicolas Werth, around 500,000 deserters were arrested in 1919 and up to 800,000 in 1920 by Cheka troops and special divisions created to combat desertions. Thousands of deserters were killed, and their families were often taken hostage. Lenin's instructions prescribed:

After the expiration of the seven-day deadline for deserters to turn themselves in, punishment must be increased for these incorrigible traitors to the cause of the people. Families and anyone found to be assisting them in any way whatsoever are to be considered as hostages and treated accordingly.

In September 1918, in just twelve provinces of Russia, 48,735 deserters and 7,325 brigands were arrested: 1,826 were executed and 2,230 were deported. A typical report from a Cheka department stated:

23 June 1919. 19h 30min. Telegram from Yaroslavl by battalion commander Frenkel, № 279, 22 June. The uprising of deserters in the Borovskaya and Petropavlovskaya volosts has been eliminated. During the liquidation, 23 armed deserters who offered resistance to our troops have been shot. In the southeastern part of the province, there is an unprecedented influx of deserters to the commissariats, which come with a request to enroll them in the ranks of the Red Army.

Estimates suggest that during the suppression of the Tambov Rebellion of 1920–1921, around 100,000 peasant rebels and their families were imprisoned or deported and perhaps 15,000 executed. During the rebellion, Mikhail Tukhachevsky (chief Red Army commander in the area) authorized Bolshevik military forces to use chemical weapons against villages with civilian population and rebels. Publications in local Communist newspapers openly glorified liquidations of "bandits" with the poison gas.

This campaign marked the beginning of the Gulag, and some scholars have estimated that 70,000 were imprisoned by September 1921 (this number excludes those in several camps in regions that were in revolt, such as Tambov). Conditions in these camps led to high mortality rates, and "repeated massacres" took place. The Cheka at the Kholmogory camp adopted the practice of drowning bound prisoners in the nearby Dvina river. Occasionally, entire prisons were "emptied" of inmates via mass shootings prior to abandoning a town to White forces.

=== Industrial workers ===
On 16 March 1919, Cheka stormed the Putilov factory. Hundreds of workers who went to a strike were arrested, of whom around 200 were executed without trial during the next few days. Numerous strikes took place in the spring of 1919 in cities of Tula, Oryol, Tver, Ivanovo, and Astrakhan. Starving workers sought to obtain food rations matching those of Red Army soldiers. They also demanded the elimination of privileges for Bolsheviks, freedom of the press, and free elections. The Cheka mercilessly suppressed all strikes, using arrests and executions.

In the city of Astrakhan, a revolt led by the White Guard broke out. In preparing for this revolt, the Whites managed to smuggle more than 3000 rifles and machine guns into the city. The leaders of the plot decided to act on the night 9–10 March 1919. The rebels were joined by wealthy peasants from the villages, which suppressed the Committees of the Poor, and committed massacres against rural activists. Eyewitnesses reported atrocities in villages such as Ivanchug, Chagan, and Karalat. In response, Soviet forces led by Kirov attempted to suppress the revolt and, together with the Committees of the Poor, restore Soviet power. The revolt in Astrakhan was brought under control by 10 March, and completely defeated by the 12th. More than 184 were sentenced to death, including monarchists, and representatives of the Kadets, Left-Socialist Revolutionaries, repeat offenders, and persons shown to have links with British and American intelligence services. The opposition media with political opponents like Chernov, and Melgunov, and others would later say that between 2,000 and 4,000 were shot or drowned from 12 to 14 of March 1919.

However, strikes continued. Lenin had concerns about the tense situation regarding workers in the Ural region. On 29 January 1920, he sent a telegram to Vladimir Smirnov stating "I am surprised that you are putting up with this and do not punish sabotage with shooting; also the delay over the transfer here of locomotives is likewise manifest sabotage; please take the most resolute measures."

At these times, there were numerous reports that Cheka interrogators used torture. At Odessa, the Cheka tied White officers to planks and slowly fed them into furnaces or tanks of boiling water; in Kharkiv, scalpings and hand-flayings were commonplace: the skin was peeled off victims' hands to produce "gloves"; the Voronezh Cheka rolled naked people around in barrels studded internally with nails; victims were crucified or stoned to death at Yekaterinoslav; the Cheka at Kremenchuk impaled members of the clergy and buried alive rebelling peasants; in Oryol, water was poured on naked prisoners bound in the winter streets until they became living ice statues; in Kiev, Chinese Cheka detachments placed rats in iron tubes sealed at one end with wire netting and the other placed against the body of a prisoner, with the tubes being heated until the rats gnawed through the victim's body in an effort to escape.

Executions took place in prison cellars or courtyards, or occasionally on the outskirts of town, during the Red Terror and Russian Civil War. After the condemned were stripped of their clothing and other belongings, which were shared among the Cheka executioners, they were either machine-gunned in batches or dispatched individually with a revolver. Those killed in prison were usually shot in the back of the neck as they entered the execution cellar, which became littered with corpses and soaked with blood. Victims killed outside the town were moved by truck, bound and gagged, to their place of execution, where they sometimes were made to dig their own graves.

According to Edvard Radzinsky, "it became a common practice to take a husband hostage and wait for his wife to come and purchase his life with her body". During decossackization, there were massacres, according to historian Robert Gellately, "on an unheard of scale". The Pyatigorsk Cheka organized a "day of Red Terror" to execute 300 people in one day, and took quotas from each part of town. According to the Chekist Karl Lander, the Cheka in Kislovodsk, "for lack of a better idea", killed all the patients in the hospital. In October 1920 alone more than 6,000 people were executed. Gellately adds that Communist leaders "sought to justify their ethnic-based massacres by incorporating them into the rubric of the 'class struggle'".

=== Clergy ===
Members of the clergy were subjected to particularly brutal abuse. According to documents cited by historian Alexander Yakovlev, then head of the Presidential Committee for the Rehabilitation of Victims of Political Repression, priests, monks and nuns were crucified, thrown into cauldrons of boiling tar, scalped, strangled, given Communion with melted lead and drowned in holes in the ice. An estimated 3,000 were put to death in 1918 alone.

== Number of deaths ==
There is no consensus among the Western historians on the number of deaths from the Red Terror. James Ryan writes that there were "at lowest estimates" "on average" 28,000 executions per year from December 1917 to February 1922, and that the number of people shot during the initial period of the Red Terror is at least 10,000. Estimates for the whole period range from 50,000 executions to an upper of 140,000 to 200,000 people, plus an additional 400,000 killed in prisons or in suppressions of local rebellions.

According to Robert Conquest, a total of 140,000 people were shot in 1917–1922, but Jonathan D. Smele estimates they were considerably fewer, "perhaps less than half that many". According to others, the number of people shot by the Cheka in 1918–1922 is about 37,300 people, shot in 1918–1921 by the verdicts of the tribunals – 14,200, although executions and atrocities were not limited to the Cheka, having been organized by the Red Army as well. The lowest among the estimates "of those who died at the hands of the Soviet government" cited by Evan Mawdsley is a figure of 12,733 executed by the Cheka between 1917 and 1920 as estimated by Martin Latsis; Mawdsley writes that "Latsis's figures seem too low, and Conquest's too high, but one can only guess", implying the figures of 50,000 victims presented by William Henry Chamberlin and 140,000 victims presented by George Leggett to be more plausible. Ronald Hingley wrote that Chamberlin's estimate "must be nearer the truth" than "1,700,000, which appears to be a considerable exaggeration." According to historian W. Bruce Lincoln (1989), the best estimations for the number of executions in total put the number at about 100,000.

Some contemporary historians present figures exceeding a million victims: Dietrich Beyrau believes the number of victims of the Red Terror to be "up to 1.3 millions" compared to between 20,000 and 100,000 of the White Terror, while a Russian historian V. Erlikhman, whose estimates are cited by Jonathan D. Smele, presents the figure of 1,200,000 deaths caused by the Red Terror compared to 300,000 victims of the White Terror.

In 1924, Popular Socialist, Sergei Melgunov (1879–1956), published a detailed account on the Red Terror in Russia, where he cited Professor Charles Saroléa's counts of 1,766,188 executions. He questioned the accuracy of the figures, but endorsed Saroléa's "characterisation of terror in Russia", stating it "in general matches reality". (Note: An online English translation of the second edition of Melgunov's work is accessible at Internet Archive, whence the following translated text is drawn (p. 85, note n. 128): "Professor [Charles] Sarolea, who published a series of articles about Russia in Edinburgh newspaper "The Scotsman" touched upon the death statistics in an essay on terror (No. 7, November 1923.). He summarized the outcome of the Bolshevik massacre as follows: 28 bishops, 1219 clergy, 6000 professors and teachers, 9000 doctors, 54,000 officers, 260,000 soldiers, 70,000 policemen, 12,950 landowners, 355,250 professionals, 193,290 workers, 815,000 peasants. The author did not provide the sources of that data. Needless to say that the precise counts seem [too] fictional, but the author's [characterisation] of terror in Russia in general matches reality." The note is somewhat abbreviated in the 1925 English edition cited in the bibliography: in particular, it omits the mention of the imaginative nature of the data.) Other sources have also characterized the widely circulated claim of 1,700,000 deaths to be a "wild exaggeration" and placed estimations closer to 50,000 over the three year Civil War period. British historian Ronald Hingley attributed the exaggerated claim of 1,700,000 to a quoted statement from White Army leader Anton Denikin.

== Justification by Bolsheviks ==
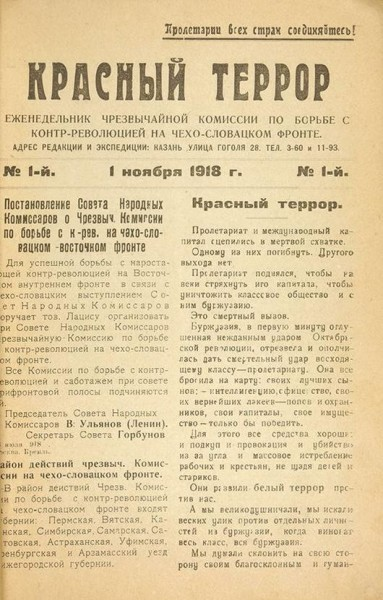
First issue of journal Krasny Terror (Red Terror) with an article by Martin Latsis justifying the Red Terror

The Red Terror in Soviet Russia was justified in Soviet historiography as a wartime campaign against counter-revolutionaries during the Russian Civil War of 1918–1922, targeting those who sided with the Whites (White Army). In his book, Terrorism and Communism: A Reply to Karl Kautsky, Trotsky also argued that the reign of terror began with the White Terror under the White Guard forces and the Bolsheviks responded with the Red Terror. Kautsky pleaded with Lenin against using violence as a form of terrorism because it was indiscriminate, intended to frighten the civilian population and included the taking and executing hostages: "Among the phenomena for which Bolshevism has been responsible, terrorism, which begins with the abolition of every form of freedom of the Press, and ends in a system of wholesale execution, is certainly the most striking and the most repellent of all."

Latsis, chief of the Ukrainian Cheka, stated in the newspaper Krasny Terror (Red Terror):

We are not waging war against individual persons. We are exterminating the bourgeoisie as a class. During the investigation, do not look for evidence that the accused acted in deed or word against Soviet power. The first questions that you ought to put are: To what class does he belong? What is his origin? What is his education or profession? And it is these questions that ought to determine the fate of the accused. In this lies the significance and essence of the Red Terror

— Martin Latsis, Red Terror, no 1, Kazan, 1 November 1918, p. 2

Lenin in response mildly criticized Latsis' determination:

Political distrust means we must not put non-Soviet people in politically responsible posts. It means the Cheka must keep a sharp eye on members of classes, sections or groups that have leanings towards the white guards. (Though, incidentally, one need not go to the same absurd lengths as Comrade Latsis, one of our finest, tried and tested Communists, did in his Kazan magazine, Krasny Terror. He wanted to say that Red terror meant the forcible suppression of exploiters who attempted to restore their rule, but instead, he put it this way [on page 2 of the first issue of his magazine]: "Don't search [!!?] the records for evidence of whether his revolt against the Soviet was an armed or only a verbal one") ... Political distrust of the members of a bourgeois apparatus is legitimate and essential. But to refuse to use them in administration and construction would be the height of folly, fraught with untold harm to communism.

— Lenin, A Little Picture in Illustration of Big Problems (1918–1919)

The Red Terror was described succinctly from the Bolshevik point of view by Grigory Zinoviev in mid-September 1918:

To dispose of our enemies, we will have to create our own socialist terror. For this we will have to train 90 million of the 100 million Russians and have them all on our side. We having nothing to say to the other 10 million; we'll have to get rid of them.

— Grigory Zinoviev, 1918

From an opposite point of view to the Bolsheviks', in November 1918, Left SR leader Maria Spiridonova, while being in prison and awaiting trial, condemned the Red Terror in her Open Letter to the Central Executive of the Bolshevik party. She wrote:

Never in the most corrupt of Parliaments, never in the most venal papers of capitalist society has hatred of opponents reached such heights of cynicism as your hatred.

[…] These nightly murders of fettered, unarmed, helpless people, these secret shootings in the back, the unceremonious burial on the spot of bodies, robbed to the very shirt, not always quite dead, often still groaning, in a mass grave – what sort of Terrorism is this? This cannot be called Terrorism. In the course of Russian revolutionary history, the word Terrorism did not merely connote revenge and intimidation (which were the very last things in its mind). No, the foremost aims of Terrorism were to protest against tyranny, to awake a sense of value in the souls of the oppressed, to rouse the conscience of those who kept silence in the face of this submission. Moreover, the Terrorist nearly always accompanied his deed by a voluntary sacrifice of his own liberty or life. Only in this way, it seems to me, could the Terrorist acts of the revolutionaries be justified. But where are these elements to be found in the cowardly Cheka, in the unbelievable moral poverty of its leaders?

… So far the working classes have brought about the Revolution under the unblemished red flag, which was red with their own blood. Their moral authority and sanction lay in their sufferings for the highest ideal of humanity. Belief in Socialism is at the same time a belief in a nobler future for humanity – a belief in goodness, truth, and beauty, in the abolition of the use of all kinds of force, in the brotherhood of the world. And now you have damaged this belief, which had inflamed the souls of the people as never before, at its very roots.

— Maria Spiridonova Open Letter to the Central Executive of the Bolshevik Party, November 1918.

== Interpretations by historians ==
=== Bolsheviks' intentions and external factors ===
Similarly to the debates around the such major problems as French Revolution and the Holocaust, there are debates in historiography between the historians who believe that the Red Terror was a product of the Bolsheviks' intentions and their ideology, and those who believe that the terror was determined by the external factors like the context the Russian Revolution took place in and the preceding Russian history of political violence. A middle position is that the historical conditions shaped not only the conditions 'external' to the Bolsheviks, but that their ideology and intentions were also historically determined.

Historians such as Stéphane Courtois (The Black Book of Communism) and Richard Pipes have argued that the Bolsheviks needed to use terror to stay in power because they lacked popular support. Pipes is a representative of 'neo-traditionalist' historians who follow the 'totalitarian' or 'traditionalist' approach which dominated during the Cold War, especially its early years, and who assert that the Revolution was something imposed 'from above' by the revolutionaries with political guile and brute force, as opposed to the 'revisionists', who put an emphasis on the 'popular' nature of the Bolshevik Revolution. Although the Bolsheviks dominated among workers, soldiers and in their revolutionary soviets, they won less than a quarter of the popular vote in elections for the Constituent Assembly held soon after the October Revolution, since they commanded much less support among the peasantry. The Constituent Assembly elections predated the split between the Right SRs, who had opposed the Bolsheviks, and the Left SRs, who were their coalition partners, consequentially many peasant votes intended for the latter went to the SRs. Massive strikes by Russian workers were "mercilessly" suppressed during the Red Terror.

According to Pipes, terror was inevitably justified by Lenin's belief that human lives were expendable in the cause of building the new order of communism. Pipes has quoted Marx's observation of the class struggles in 19th-century France: "The present generation resembles the Jews whom Moses led through the wilderness. It must not only conquer a new world, it must also perish in order to make room for the people who are fit for a new world"; yet, Pipes noted that neither Karl Marx nor Friedrich Engels encouraged mass murder.

Leszek Kołakowski wrote that while Bolsheviks (especially Lenin) were very much focused on the Marxian concept of revolution and dictatorship of the proletariat long before the October Revolution; Lenin's clearest definitions of dictatorship of proletariat were "unlimited power based on force and not on law," power that is "absolutely unrestricted by any rules whatever and based directly on violence" and "directest form of coercion" of the overthrown classes. In 1918, Lenin made a "furious reply" to his critics such as Karl Kautsky, who argued that Marxian notion of dictatorship of proletariat never meant the destruction of democracy, but on the contrary, that democratic institutions were a necessary condition of it, in The Proletarian Revolution and the Renegade Kautsky (1918), accusing Kautsky of talking of democracy irrespectively of its class content and arguing that the working class may rule only by force. A direct theoretical and systematic argument in favor of organized terror in response to Kautsky's reservations was written by Trotsky in The Defence of Terrorism (1921). Trotsky wrote that "the revolutionary supremacy of the proletariat presupposes within the proletariat itself the political supremacy" of the single party governing by a dictatorship and elimination of its opponents, that to reject state terrorism meant to reject socialism since "he who wills the end must end the means", dismissed the principle of the rights of the individual as "irrelevant nonsence" and, according to Kolakowski, implied that "rightness" of a historical movement or a state is determined by whether its use of violence is successful against its political enemies. Trotsky also introduced and provided ideological justification for many of the future features characterizing the Bolshevik system such as "militarization of labor" and concentration camps.

Eric Hobsbawm, despite his sympathy for the October Revolution and Communist movements, also recognized Lenin's beliefs, like his view of political struggle as a total war and a zero-sum game, as one of the reasons of the Red Terror and the mass violence carried out by the Bolsheviks, although he writes that "it was not so much the belief that a great end justifies all the means necessary to achieve it..., or even the belief that the sacrifices imposed on the present generation, however large, are as nothing to the benefits which will be reaped by the endless generations of the future", but "the application of the principle of total war to all times. Leninism, perhaps because of the powerful strain of voluntarism which made other Marxists distrust Lenin as a 'Blanquist' or 'Jacobin,' thought essentially in military terms, as his own admiration for Clausewitz would indicate, even if the entire vocabulary of Bolshevik politics did not bear witness to it."

Orlando Figes' view was that Red Terror was implicit, not so much in Marxism itself, but in the tumultuous violence of the Russian Revolution. He noted that there were a number of Bolsheviks, led by Lev Kamenev, Nikolai Bukharin, and Mikhail Olminsky, who criticized the actions and warned that thanks to "Lenin's violent seizure of power and his rejection of democracy," the Bolsheviks would be "forced to turn increasingly to terror to silence their political critics and subjugate a society they could not control by other means." Figes also asserts that the Red Terror "erupted from below. It was an integral element of the social revolution from the start. The Bolsheviks encouraged but did not create this mass terror. The main institutions of the Terror were all shaped, at least in part, in response to these pressures from below."

The Hungarian historian Tamás Krausz supports the view that terror was rather a result of objective processes, and notes that Lenin, as Trotsky wrote earlier, formed his more differentiated position regarding terror over a period of years. In the period of the First Russian Revolution, Lenin objected terror as a means of "expropriating private property", since the revolutionary forces were not at war with individuals, but with the system, and viewed terror only as a secondary tool of countering state violence in the moments of revolutionary upheaval, and in 1907, the Bolsheviks accepted a resolution which denounced terror and rejected it as a method in advance. Krausz writes that terror was not something rooted in revolutionary theory, but a result of a combination of Russian traditions of political violence with the cult of violence brought by World War I and the escalation of struggle into a civil war, in which both sides sought to annihilate each other, and in which the White Terror was emerging as a threat to the revolution prior to the Red Terror, what was manifested in the order to the White troops to "take no prisoners." In the sphere of ideas, the possible sources could be Bakunin's idea of a "collective Razin" embodied both in the popular rebellion and in the popular leader "at the head of the masses", a concept spread among Russian revolutionaries, and the Marxist concept of the 'dictatorship of the proletariat'; Lenin also drew the idea of a necessity of terror from his reading of the histories of the French Revolution and American Civil War. Krausz, however, notes that these sources of influence could have taken significance only in the historical conditions of the "emergency situation".

Douglas Greene notes that at first, the Bolsheviks hoped not to resort to terror to carry out the revolution, citing Lenin's words shortly after the takeover: "Ours is not the French revolutionary terror which guillotined unarmed people, and I hope we shall not go so far." According to Greene, further self-identification of the Bolsheviks with the Jacobins became prominent among them as they found themselves in the situation of a civil war, foreign invasion, peasant uprisings, and economic collapse.

James Ryan claims that Lenin never advocated for the physical extermination of the entire bourgeoisie as a class, just the execution of those who were actively involved in opposing and undermining Bolshevik rule. He did intend to bring about "the overthrow and complete abolition of the bourgeoisie" through non-violent political and economic means, but he also noted that in reality the period of transition from capitalism to communism 'is a period of unprecedentedly violent class struggle in unprecedentedly acute forms, and, consequently, during this period the state must inevitably be a state that is democratic in a new way (for the proletariat and propertyless in general) and dictatorial in a new way (against the bourgeoise)'.

=== Comparison of Red and White Terror ===
A number of historians, such as Pipes and Nicolas Werth (The Black Book of Communism), contrasted the Red and White Terrors, claiming that while Red Terror was a political strategy and a "revolutionary" means of reconstructing the world, ideological and instrumental, the White Terror was restorative, arbitrary and a temporary measure, mere "repressive violence" to re-establish a previous status quo. Robert Conquest was convinced that "unprecedented terror must seem necessary to ideologically motivated attempts to transform society massively and speedily, against its natural possibilities", while Werth wrote:

The Bolshevik policy of terror was more systematic, better organized, and targeted at whole social classes. Moreover, it had been thought out and put into practice before the outbreak of the civil war. The White Terror was never systematized in such a fashion. It was almost invariably the work of detachments that were out of control, and taking measures not officially authorized by the military command that was attempting, without much success, to act as a government. If one discounts the pogroms, which Denikin himself condemned, the White Terror most often was a series of reprisals by the police acting as a sort of military counterespionage force. The Cheka and the Troops for the Internal Defense of the Republic were a structured and powerful instrument of repression of a completely different order, which had support at the highest level from the Bolshevik regime.

Such notion is refuted by Peter Holquist and Joshua Sanborn. Holquist wrote that "White violence may have been less centralized and systematic, but it did not lack ideological underpinnings. [...] It is hard to imagine that the massacre of tens of thousands of Jews by the anti-Soviet armies during the civil wars... could have occurred without some form of ideology – and particularly the virulent linkage drawn between Jews and Communists." According to Sanborn, the terror carried out by the Russian Imperial Army and the Whites was as 'revolutionary' as their Red counterpart:

...in the case of the Jews, we see not only the development of terror practices (like hostage-taking, decimation, mass retribution, mass deportation, rape, robbery, and sadistic, spectacularly cruel violence), but of the social intent. Most notably, efforts on the part of Ianushkevich’s Stavka to gather material on Jewish behavior in the army stressed that commanders were to gather this to prove all the “harm” that Jews posed to the army and to the nation. Given the tone and exclusionary fantasies of both prewar and wartime anti-Semitic discourse, we see in the Jewish terror a facet of White Terror that cannot simply be seen as a method of military dictatorship, a requirement of wartime emergency, or even the most brutal of counter-insurgency strategies. These were processes that were justified by the war atmosphere, but whose vision extended well into the post-war period. As a result, the White Terror, like the Imperial Army's Terror campaign from 1914–1917, was revolutionary in its Terror against Jews, and who knows, might have taken this kernel even further had they prevailed in the Civil War.

== Historical significance ==
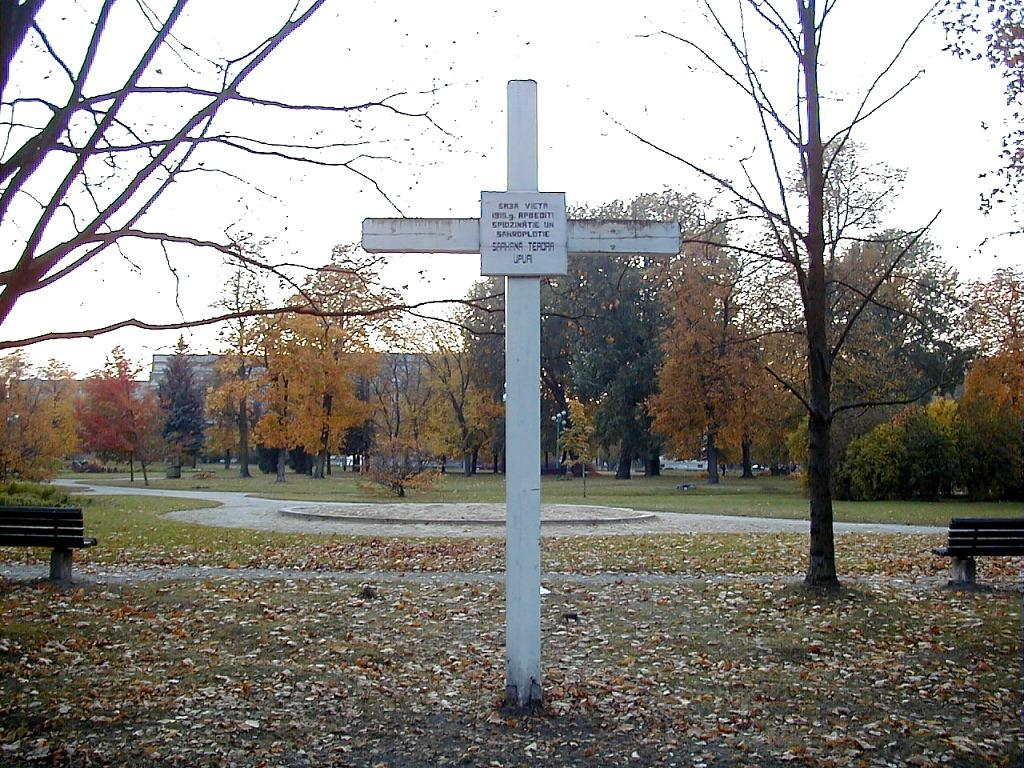
A memorial cross in Jelgava, Latvia, marking the burial place of Red Terror victims killed in January, February, and March 1919 at Jelgava Prison.

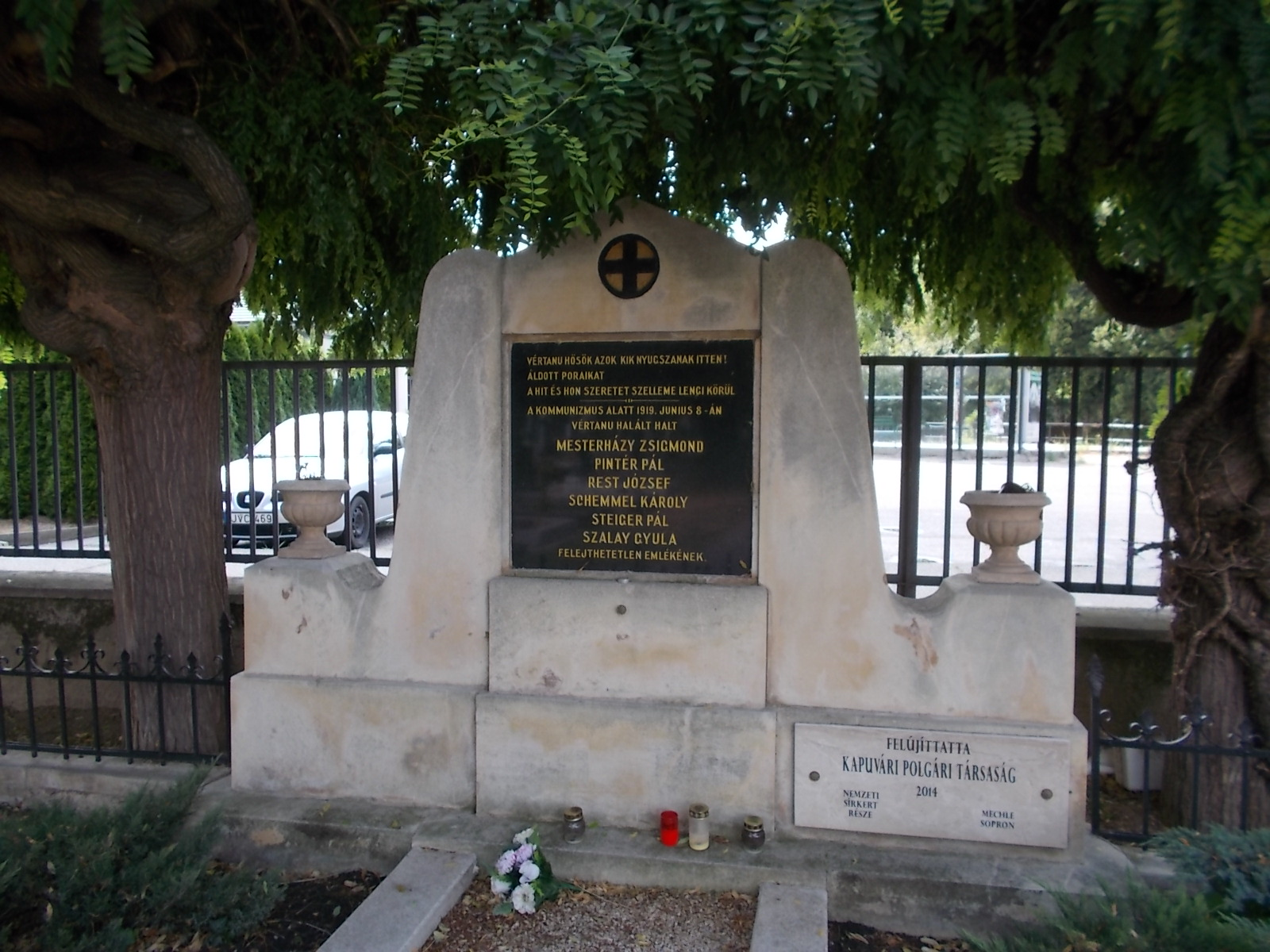
Memorial grave of the Red Terror victims in Holy Cross Public Cemetery, Kapuvár, Hungary.

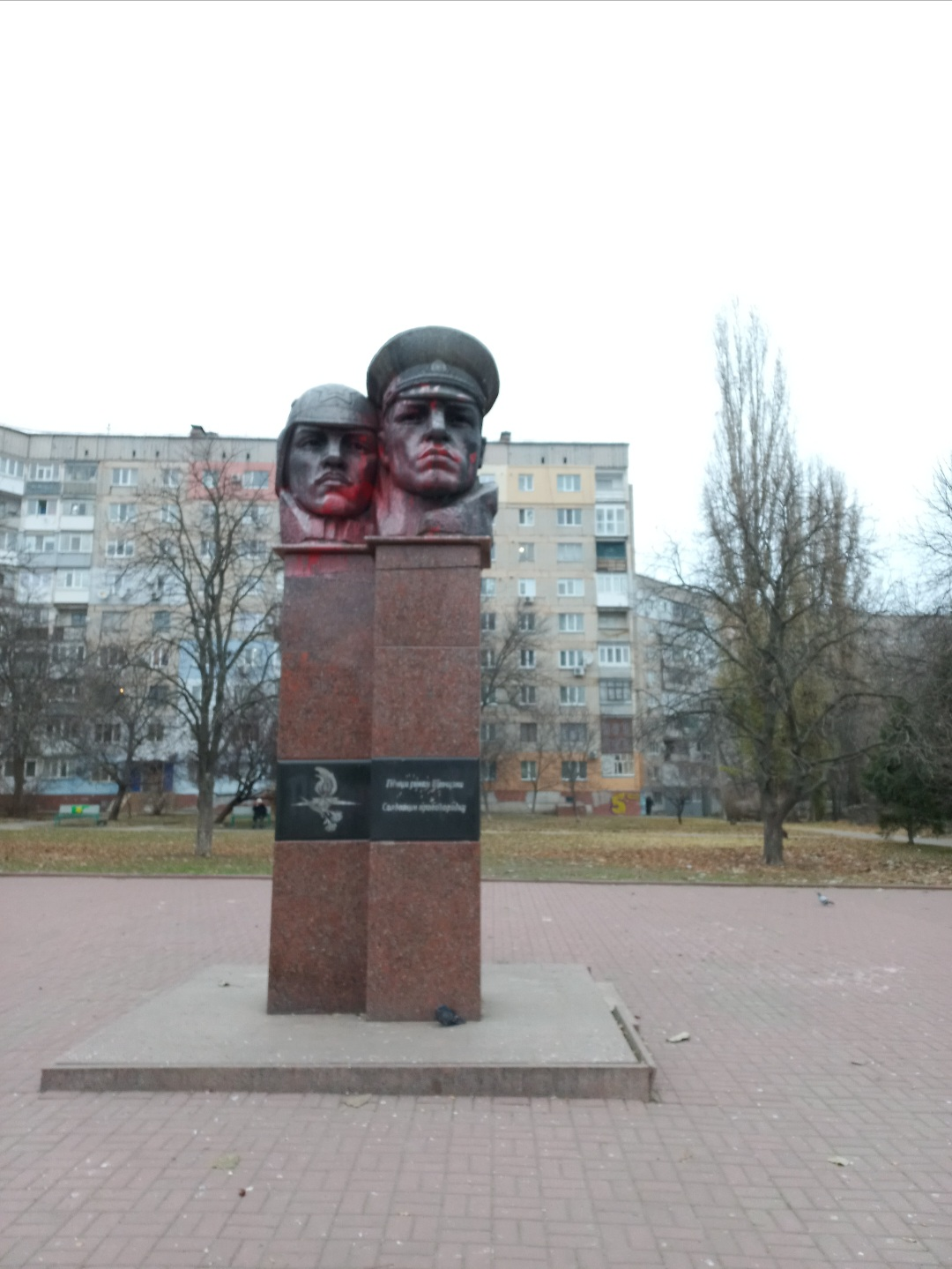
Memorial to the Chekists in Kropyvnytskyi, Ukraine

The Red Terror was significant because it was the first of numerous communist terror campaigns which were waged in Soviet Russia and many other countries. It also triggered the Russian Civil War according to historian Pipes. Menshevik Julius Martov wrote about the Red Terror:

The beast has licked hot human blood. The man-killing machine is brought into motion ... But blood breeds blood ... We witness the growth of the bitterness of the civil war, the growing bestiality of men engaged in it.

The term "Red Terror" was later used in reference to other campaigns of violence which were waged by communist or communist-affiliated groups. Some other events which were also called "Red Terrors" include:

- Finnish Red Terror – executions and political violence carried out by the Finnish Reds during the 1918 Civil War in Finland.
- Hungarian Red Terror – executions of up to 590 people accused in counter-revolutionary activities against the Hungarian Soviet Republic in 1919.
- Red Terror in Bavaria – assassinations of 12 men in the Bavarian Soviet Republic by the Socialist and Communist revolutionaries during the German revolution of 1918–1919.
- Spanish Red Terror – assassinations and actions of violence carried out during the Spanish Civil War by Republican groups.
- Yugoslavian Red Terror – another name for the "Leftist errors", the period of political violence by the Yugoslav Partisans from 1941 to 1942 in Yugoslavia during its occupation by the Axis.
- Greek Red Terror – a campaign of repression which was waged in Greece by the communist organizations of the Greek resistance (during the Axis occupation of Greece which coincided with World War II) and the Greek Civil War (1943–49).
- Ethiopian Red Terror – a campaign of repression which was waged by the Derg during the rule of Mengistu Haile Mariam.
- Chinese Red Terror – a campaign of repression in Maoist China during the Cultural Revolution which is believed to have begun with the Red August of 1966. According to Mao Zedong himself: "Red terror ought to be our reply to these counter-revolutionaries. We must, especially in the war zones and in the border areas, deal immediately, swiftly with every kind of counter-revolutionary activity."

== See also ==
- Bibliography of the Russian Revolution and Civil War
- Outline of the Russian Revolution and Civil War
- Index of articles related to the Russian Revolution and Civil War
- Political terror in Finland and Baltic States after World War I
- The Black Book of Communism
- Chekism
- Human rights in the Soviet Union
- Murder of the Romanov family
- Lenin's Hanging Order
- List of mass graves from Soviet mass executions
- Persecution of Christians in the Soviet Union
- Pogroms during the Russian Civil War
- Political repression in the Soviet Union
- Revolutionary terror
- Russian famine of 1921–1922
- Terrorism and the Soviet Union
- White Terror

== Bibliography and further reading ==
See also: Bibliography of the Russian Revolution and Civil War § Violence and terror

- Brovkin, Vladimir N. (1994). Behind the Front Lines of the Civil War: Political Parties and Social Movements in Russia, 1918–1922. Princeton: Princeton University Press. ISBN 0-691-03278-5.
- Figes, Orlando (1998). A People's Tragedy: The Russian Revolution 1891–1924. Penguin Books. ISBN 0670-859168.
- Gellately, Robert (2008). Lenin, Stalin, and Hitler: The Age of Social Catastrophe. Knopf. ISBN 978-1-4000-3213-6.
- Graziosi, Andrea (2007). L'URSS di Lenin e Stalin. Storia dell'Unione Sovietica 1914–1945 (in Italian). Bologna: il Mulino. ISBN 978-88-15-13786-9.
- Leggett, George (1981). The Cheka: Lenin's political police. The All–Russian Extraordinary Commission for Combating Counter–Revolution and Sabotage, December 1917 to February 1922. Oxford: Clarendon Press. ISBN 0-19-822552-0.
- Lowe, Norman (2002). Mastering Twentieth Century Russian History. Palgrave. ISBN 978-0-333-96307-4.
- Mayer, Arno J. (2002). The Furies: Violence and Terror in the French and Russian Revolutions. Princeton University Press. ISBN 978-0-691-09015-3.
- Melgunov, Sergei Petrovich (2008) [1924]. Der rote Terror in Russland 1918–1923 (reprint of the 1924 Olga Diakow edition) (in German). Berlin: OEZ. ISBN 978-3-940452-47-4.
- Melgunov, Sergei Petrovich (November 1927). "The Record of the Red Terror". Current History. 27 (2): 198–205. doi:10.1525/curh.1927.27.2.198. JSTOR 45332605. S2CID 207926889.
- Melgunov, Sergei Petrovich (1925). The Red Terror in Russia. London & Toronto: Dent (reprinted in 1975 by Hyperion, Westport, CT. ISBN 0-88355-187-X).
- Pipes, Richard (2011). Russia Under the Bolshevik Regime. Knopf Doubleday Publishing Group. ISBN 978-0-307-78861-0.
- Ryan, James (2012). Lenin's Terror: The Ideological Origins of Early Soviet State Violence. London: Routledge. ISBN 978-1-138-81568-1.
- Smele, Jonathan D. (2015). "Red terror". Historical dictionary of the Russian civil wars, 1916–1926. Lanham, Maryland: Rowman & Littlefield. pp. 932–934. ISBN 978-1-4422-5281-3.
- Steinberg, Isaac (1935). Spiridonova: Revolutionary Terrorist. London: Methuen.
- Trotsky, Leon (2017) [1920]. Terrorism and Communism: A Reply to Karl Kautsky. Verso. ISBN 978-1-78663-343-9. See also text on marxists.org.
- Werth, Nicolas (1999). "A State against Its People: Violence, Repression, and Terror in the Soviet Union". The Black Book of Communism: Crimes, Terror, Repression. Harvard University Press. pp. 33–268. ISBN 978-0-674-07608-2.
- Werth, Nicolas; Bartosek, Karel; Panné, Jean-Louis; Margolin, Jean-Louis; Paczkowski, Andrzej; Courtois, Stéphane (1999). Black Book of Communism: Crimes, Terror, Repression. Harvard University Press. ISBN 0-674-07608-7.
