= Zvi Ribak =

Ukrainian painter

- צבי ריבק
- Born: 1910; Zhytomyr, Russian Empire
- Died: 1994 (aged 83–84); Israel
- Spouse: Sussane Esther Weber (divorced) Batia Waisman
- Children: 4, including 3 sons & 1 daughter

Zvi Ribak (Hebrew: צבי ריבק, Russian: Зви Рибак; Zhytomyr, Russian Empire 1910 - Israel 1994) was a Jewish painter.

== Early life ==
Ribak grew up in Radomyshl in a family of religious Jews. He lived a life of relative leisure until the age of 7 when a pogrom came to his town and killed 880 people. This was at the beginning of what came to be known as the white terror. After the pogroms his family relocated to Kiev, where Ribak, age 8, was already recognized to have extraordinary talent. He was given permission to attend an art studio that housed artists such as Kipnis, Pinchuk, and Reznikov.

During the winter of 1919 Marc Chagall came to visit and took interest in young Ribak's paintings. He offered to take Ribak with him to Paris, but Ribak's father did not allow him to go. At the age of 14 he joined the Bubarikin studio. Ribak was told that he could have his livelihood assured as a painter if he would paint portraits of Soviet leaders. Ribak refused, saying that this would be worse than eating pork. So he decided to learn another profession to support himself.

== Education ==
He applied to study architecture at the Kiev Polytechnic but was rejected because he didn't belong to the proletariat or to the Communist Party. He was similarly rejected from the Leningrad Academy of Art.

Having no alternative, he traveled to Donbas, where he found work as an electrician in a coal mine. From there he went to the technological institute in Kharkiv where he studied nuclear physics under Lev Davidovich Landau, who later won the Nobel Prize in 1962. After he graduated he applied to a higher academy of advanced art in Moscow, and he was accepted despite the fact that he was a Jew.

== World War 2 ==
After the war broke out with Germany, he enlisted in the red army.

"I didn't even know how to fire a gun, but reports of the horrors being perpetrated by Germans against Jews had reached us. We knew what they had done in Warsaw. I was filled with feelings of vengeance. With all my might I wanted, in my own small way, to stop the annihilation of the Jewish people."

His father was killed by Nazis in the Kiev Ghetto on Rosh Hashanah 1940. Ribak served on the Central front under the Jewish General Tschernikhovsky. He took part in the conquest of Prague, Warsaw, and Berlin. He was among the group that captured Hitler's bunker in Berlin. He ended the war as a Russian officer and recipient of eight decorations, among them "Hero of Russia", "Cross of Lenin", and the "Cross of Stalin". After the war, Ribak set up the organization of Jewish artist, survivors of the Holocaust.

== Later life ==
In 1945 Ribak married Sussane Esther Weber. They had one son and got divorced. In 1948, Ribak immigrated to Israel, a long time dream fulfilled, and joined the fight for independence. He participated in the battles on the Eastern front near Netanya as a member of a religious company. After the war, Ribak found employment first as an engineer and later as an architect for the city of Tel Aviv. Despite the cities secular nature, Ribak always maintained a religious lifestyle. In 1952 he met the rabbi Avraham Yeshaya Karelitz and moved to Bnei Brak, then a developing city. For ten years he worked as a city planner in Bnei Brak. He had one son with his first wife, Sussane Esther. With his second wife Batia, he had 2 sons and a daughter. Many of his works focus on Jewish subjects from the world that had been destroyed.

In 1990 Jay Weinstein of Sotheby's edited a book called Zvi Ribak: A Jewish Artist Weinstein wrote of Ribak's paintings, "He did not paint the candelabrum, he painted the flame."
