= White Terror (Russia) =

Persecution by the White movement during the Russian Civil War

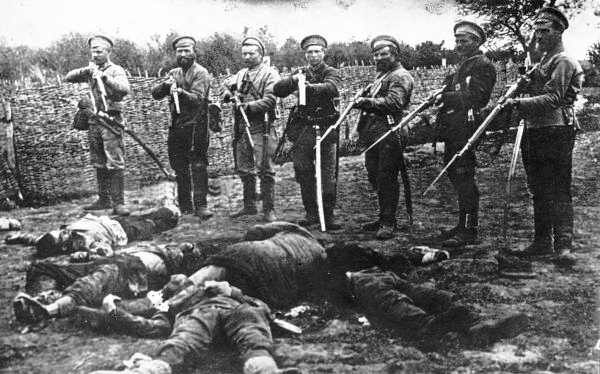
- Execution of the members of the Alexandrovo-Gaysky District regional Soviet by Cossacks under the command of Ataman Alexander Dutov, 1918.
- Native name: Белый террор
- Duration: 1917–1923
- Location: Former Russian Empire
- Type: Mass killings, executions, pogroms, political violence, genocide
- Motive: Anti-communism, antisemitism (Jewish Bolshevism conspiracy theory), Russian nationalism, Russian monarchism, political repression against opposition and dissent
- Target: Bolsheviks, Jews, ethnic minorities
- Perpetrators: White movement and the Russian State
- Deaths: Estimates range between 20,000 and more than 500,000 excluding pogroms

The White Terror (Russian: Белый террор, romanized: Belyy terror) in the former Russian Empire refers to violence and mass killings carried out by the White movement and its governments of Russia during the Russian Civil War (1917–1923). Individual acts against Bolshevik rule, such as assassinations, commenced at least by the end of 1917. Violence on any sizable scale on the part of the Whites arguably began in early 1918, continuing until the defeat of the Whites at the hands of the Red Army from 1920 to 1922. Unlike in the case of the Red Terror, there was no formal decree which kickstarted the White Terror. The White Terror was most acute in the Far East, under warlords such as Grigory Semyonov and Baron Roman von Ungern-Sternberg.

Though the Bolsheviks' Red Terror officially began on September 5, 1918 in response to several planned assassinations of Bolshevik leaders, incidents of violence carried out by Bolsheviks and their supporters had been ongoing since the October Revolution. According to some Russian historians, the White Terror was a series of premeditated actions directed by their leaders; this view is contested by Russian historians who view it as spontaneous and disorganized. According to some historians, the White Terror evolved from a disorganized policy to a system of political repression sanctioned by the Russian State and its system of military dictatorship which targeted not only the Bolsheviks, but members of other parties and other people as well. Some historians believe the antisemitic pogroms carried out by the Whites to be a part of the White Terror.

According to historian Ronald Suny, total estimates for the White Terror are difficult to ascertain due to the role of multiple administrations and violence perpetrated by undisciplined, independent anti-Bolshevik forces. However, Suny did highlight the higher proportion of antisemitic attacks by the White military forces, who were responsible for 17% of pogroms throughout the Russian Civil War (compared to 8.5% for the Red forces).

== Comparison with the Red Terror ==
A number of Western historians, such as Richard Pipes and Nicolas Werth (The Black Book of Communism), contrasted the Red and White Terrors, claiming that while Red Terror was a political strategy and a "revolutionary" means of reconstructing the world, ideological and instrumental, the White Terror was restorative, arbitrary and a temporary measure, mere "repressive violence" to re-establish a previous status quo. Robert Conquest was convinced that "unprecedented terror must seem necessary to ideologically motivated attempts to transform society massively and speedily, against its natural possibilities", while Werth wrote:

The Bolshevik policy of terror was more systematic, better organized, and targeted at whole social classes. Moreover, it had been thought out and put into practice before the outbreak of the civil war. The White Terror was never systematized in such a fashion. It was almost invariably the work of detachments that were out of control, and taking measures not officially authorized by the military command that was attempting, without much success, to act as a government. If one discounts the pogroms, which Denikin himself condemned, the White Terror most often was a series of reprisals by the police acting as a sort of military counterespionage force. The Cheka and the Troops for the Internal Defense of the Republic were a structured and powerful instrument of repression of a completely different order, which had support at the highest level from the Bolshevik regime.

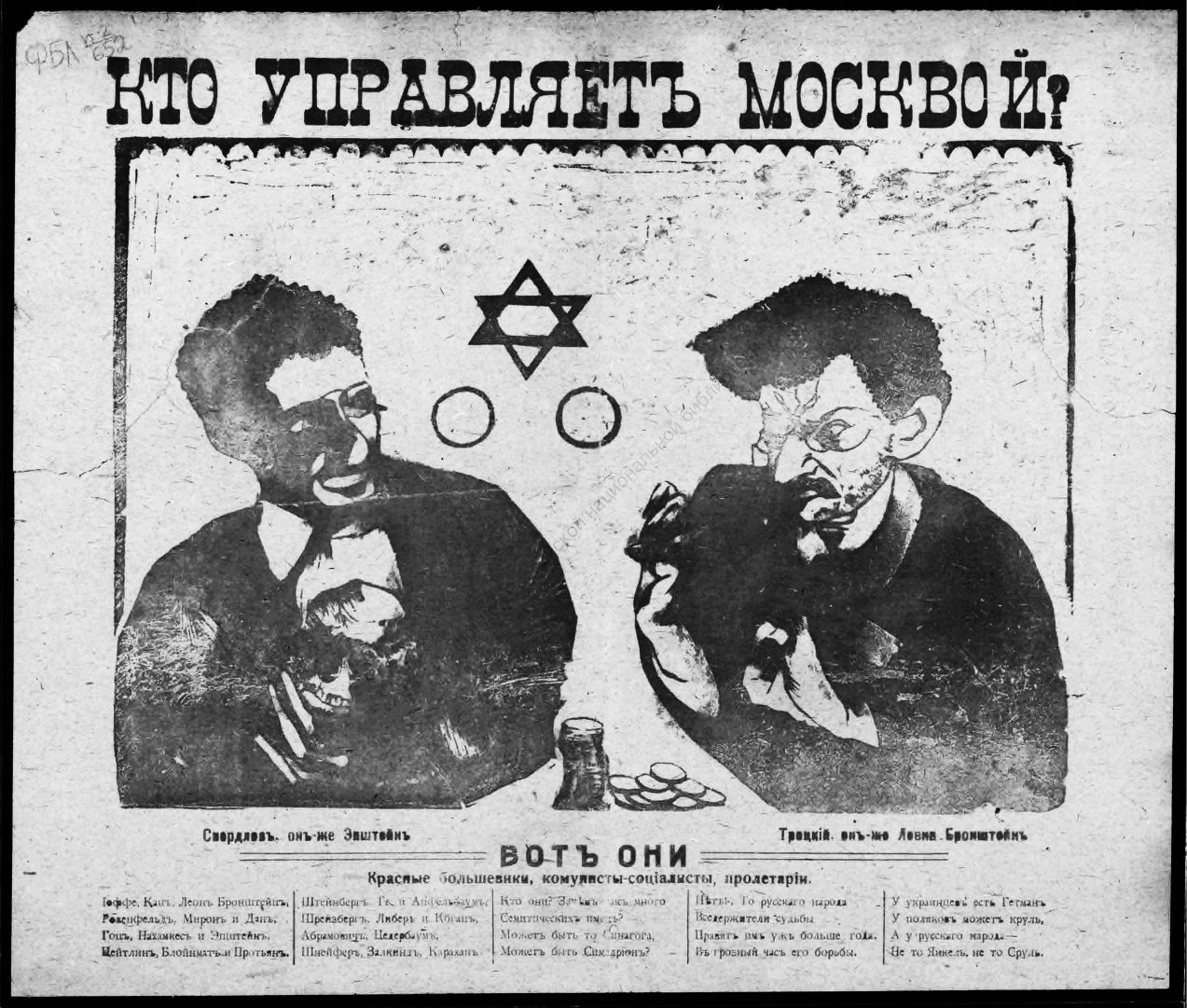
Antisemitic Russian White movement propaganda poster Who Rules Moscow? Here they are – Red Bolsheviks, Communists-Socialists, Proletarians (1919), caricature of senior Bolsheviks Yakov Sverdlov and Leon Trotsky with the Star of David, depicting the Bolsheviks as Jews oppressing Russians and striving for money and power

Such notion is refuted by Peter Holquist and Joshua Sanborn. Holquist wrote:

"White violence may have been less centralized and systematic, but it did not lack ideological underpinnings. One might suggest here an analogy with the German Freikorps, whose ideology was much more an ethos and a style than a coherent doctrine – but was no less an ideology for that. It is hard to imagine that the massacre of tens of thousands of Jews by the anti-Soviet armies during the civil wars... could have occurred without some form of ideology – and particularly the virulent linkage drawn between Jews and Communists. Anti-Soviet commanders and foot soldiers alike believed they knew who their enemies were, and they equally believed they knew what they had to do with such foes. White commanders sifted their POWs, selecting out those they deemed undesirable and incorrigible (Jews, Balts, Chinese, Communists), and executed these individuals in groups later, a process the Whites described as "filtering."

According to Sanborn, the terror carried out by the Russian Imperial Army and the Whites was as 'revolutionary' as their Red counterpart:

...in the case of the Jews, we see not only the development of terror practices (like hostage-taking, decimation, mass retribution, mass deportation, rape, robbery, and sadistic, spectacularly cruel violence), but of the social intent. Most notably, efforts on the part of Ianushkevich’s Stavka to gather material on Jewish behavior in the army stressed that commanders were to gather this to prove all the “harm” that Jews posed to the army and to the nation. Given the tone and exclusionary fantasies of both prewar and wartime anti-Semitic discourse, we see in the Jewish terror a facet of White Terror that cannot simply be seen as a method of military dictatorship, a requirement of wartime emergency, or even the most brutal of counter-insurgency strategies. These were processes that were justified by the war atmosphere, but whose vision extended well into the post-war period. As a result, the White Terror, like the Imperial Army's Terror campaign from 1914–1917, was revolutionary in its Terror against Jews, and who knows, might have taken this kernel even further had they prevailed in the Civil War.

British historian Ronald Hingley believes that the estimated casualties associated with the Red Terror have been exaggerated due to White Army propaganda, with a lower estimate of 50,000 which "must be nearer the truth" than "1,700,000, which appears to be a considerable exaggeration."

A number of Russian historians believe that, unlike the Red Terror proclaimed by the Bolsheviks as a means of establishing their political dominance, the term 'White Terror' had neither legislative nor propaganda approval in the White movement during the Civil War. Historians admit that the White armies were not alien to the cruelty inherent in the war, however, they believe that the "black pages" of the White armies differed fundamentally from the policy of the Bolsheviks:

- The Whites did not create organizations similar to the Bolshevik emergency commissions (Cheka) and revolutionary tribunals;
- The leaders of the White movement never called for mass terror, for executions on social grounds, for the taking and execution of hostages if the enemies did not comply with certain requirements;
- The members of the White movement saw neither ideological nor practical necessity in carrying out mass terror. They were convinced that the purpose of the Whites' military actions was not a war against some broad masses or social classes, but a war with a small party that had seized power in Russia and used the socio-economic and political situation, as well as market conditions, in their own interests to achieve the goal, as well as manipulating the changes in the moods of the lower classes of Russian society.

A number of researchers believe that the peculiarity of the White Terror was its disorganized, spontaneous nature, and that it was not elevated to the rank of state policy, did not act as a means of intimidating the population and did not serve as a means of destroying social classes or ethnic groups (Cossacks, Kalmyks), something the Bolsheviks did.

At the same time, a number of Russian historians point out that the orders issued by high officials of the White movement, as well as the legislative acts of the White governments, testify to the sanctioning by the military and political authorities of repressive actions and acts of terror against the Bolsheviks and the population supporting them, and their role in intimidating the population of controlled territories.

Doctor of Historical Sciences G. A. Trukan notes that Soviet authors focused mainly on the White Terror, while many modern authors who sympathize with the White movement act the other way around. However, according to Trukan, in the territories occupied by the Whites, there were no less atrocities and outrages than in Bolshevik-controlled territory.

== Number of deaths ==
Dietrich Beyrau estimates victims of the White Terror between 20,000 and 100,000 people excluding the victims of the pogroms compared to "up to 1.3 millions" of the Red Terror, while Jonathan Smele cites the estimates of the Russian historian V. Erlikhman of 300,000 victims of the White Terror compared to 1,200,000 of the Red Terror. Smele also personally notes that while the number of victims is certain to be in the tens of thousands, an exact estimate will probably never be known, though he estimates it to be less than the Red Terror due to the Bolsheviks having control over larger populations than the Whites.

Russian historian Nikita Ratkovsky believes that the number of the victims of the White Terror may exceed 500,000 excluding pogroms and notes that by the estimate of the Cheka presented during the 1920 trial of Kolchak's ministers, at least 25,000 people were executed by the Kolchak regime in Yekaterinburg Governorate alone between 1918 and 1919.

Ronal Suny stated that the casualties of the White Terror were likely lower than that of the Red Terror (estimated between 50,000 and 140,000) if restricted to just atrocities committed by the White movement, but would exceed it with the inclusion of anti-Soviet popular violence and Jewish pogroms into the death toll, such as those by Symon Petliura's forces.

The 1985 Whitaker Report of the United Nations cited that 100,000 to 250,000 Jews in more than 2,000 pogroms were killed by a mixture of Whites, Cossacks and Ukrainian nationalists as a modern example of genocide.

== Southern and Western Russia ==
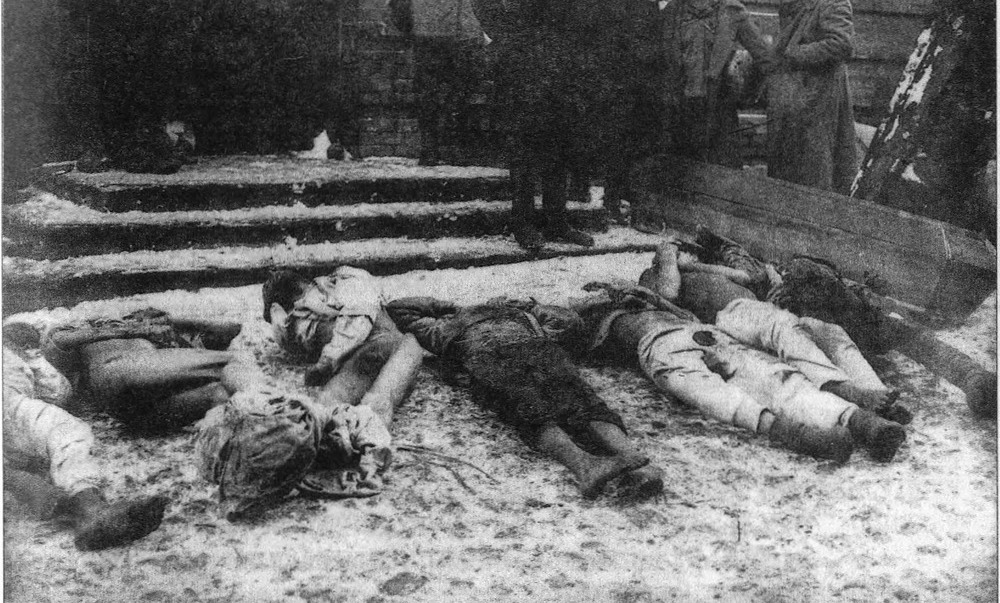
Bodies of prisoners in Bakhmut poisoned by Denikin's troops, 1919

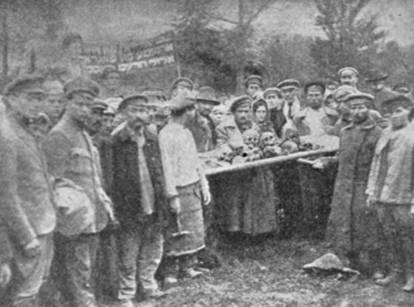
Aftermath of a pogrom in Fastov, 1919

Numerous pogroms were committed during the Russian Civil War, including by the Whites. The 1985 Whitaker Report of the United Nations cited that 100,000 to 250,000 Jews in more than 2,000 pogroms were killed by a mixture of Whites, Cossacks and Ukrainian nationalists. Tens of thousands of Jews were left homeless and thousands became victims of serious illness.

Modern estimates of Jewish deaths during the Russian Civil War have been lower, between 1918 and 1921, a total of 1,236 pogroms were committed against Jews in 524 towns in Ukraine. Estimates of the number of Jews who were killed in these pogroms range from 30,000 to 60,000. Of the recorded 1,236 pogroms and excesses, 493 of them were carried out by Ukrainian People's Republic soldiers who were under the command of Symon Petliura, 307 of them were carried out by independent Ukrainian warlords, 213 of them were carried out by Denikin's army, 106 of them were carried out by the Red Army and 32 of them were carried out by the Polish Army. Ronald Suny estimates that 35,000 to 150,000 deaths occurred amongst Jews in the Russian Civil War, with about 17% of these attributable to the White armies, rest being attributed at 40% to the Ukrainians under Simon Petlura, 25% by other Ukrainian forces and 8.5% by the Bolsheviks.

After Lavr Kornilov was killed in April 1918, the leadership of the Volunteer Army passed to Anton Denikin. During the Denikin regime, the press regularly urged violence against Jews. For example, a proclamation by one of Denikin's generals incited people to "arm themselves" in order to extirpate "the evil force which lives in the hearts of Jew-communists." In the small town of Fastov alone, Denikin's Volunteer Army murdered over 1,500 Jews, mostly the elderly, women, and children.

In the Don Province, the Soviet government was pushed out by a Cossack regime headed by Pyotr Krasnov. Approximately 25,000 to 40,000 people were executed by Krasnov's White Cossacks, which lasted until the Red Army conquered the region following their victory at Tsaritsyn.

In 1918 when the Whites controlled the Northern Territory with a population of about 400,000 people, more than 38,000 were sent to prisons. Of those, about 8,000 were executed while thousands more died from torture and disease.

== Eastern Russia ==
In November 1918, after seizing power in Siberia, Admiral Alexander Kolchak pursued a policy of persecuting revolutionaries as well as socialists of several factions. Kolchak's government issued a broadly worded decree on December 3, 1918, revising articles of the criminal code of Imperial Russia "in order to preserve the system and rule of the Supreme Ruler". Articles 99 and 100 established capital punishment for assassination attempts on the Supreme Ruler and for attempting to overthrow the authorities. Under Article 103, "insults written, printed, and oral, are punishable by imprisonment". Bureaucratic sabotage under Article 329 was punishable by hard labor for 15 to 20 years. Additional decrees followed, adding more power. On April 11, 1919, the Kolchak government adopted Regulation 428, "About the dangers of public order due to ties with the Bolshevik Revolt", which was published in the Omsk newspaper Omsk Gazette (no. 188 of July 1919). It provided a term of 5 years of prison for "individuals considered a threat to the public order because of their ties in any way with the Bolshevik revolt". In the case of an unauthorized return from exile, there could be hard labor for 4 to 8 years. Articles 99–101 allowed the death penalty, forced labor and imprisonment, and repression by military courts, and they also imposed no investigation commissions.

An excerpt from the order of the government of Yenisei county in the Irkutsk Governorate, General. Sergey Rozanov said:

Those villages whose population meets troops with arms, burn down the villages and shoot the adult males without exception. If hostages are taken in cases of resistance to government troops, shoot the hostages without mercy.

A member of the Central Committee of the right-wing Socialist Revolutionaries, D. Rakov wrote about the terror of Kolchak's forces:

Omsk just froze in horror. At a time when the wives of dead comrades, day and night looked in the snow for bodies, I was unaware of the horror behind the walls of the guardhouse. At least 2500 people were killed. Entire carts of bodies were carried to a city, like winter lamb and pork carcasses. Those who suffered were mainly soldiers of the garrison and the workers.

Even the Czech-Slovaks, who had spearheaded the anti-Bolshevik uprising in Siberia, became appalled by Kolchak's regime in Omsk. On November 15, 1919, they delivered a memorandum to the Allied representatives in Vladivostok:

The military authorities of the Government of Omsk are permitting criminal actions that will stagger the entire world. The burning of villages, the murder of masses of peaceful inhabitants, and the shooting of hundreds of persons of democratic convictions and also those only suspected of political disloyalty occurs daily.

Two days later, General Radola Gajda led a revolt in Vladivostok against Kolchak's authority.

In the Urals, Siberia, and the Far East, extraordinary cruelty was practiced by several Cossack warlords: B. Annenkov, A. Dutov, G. Semyonov, and I. Kalmykov. During the trial against Annenkov, there was testimony about the robbing of peasants and atrocities perpetrated under the slogan: “We have no restrictions! God is with us and Ataman Annenkov: slash right and left!”. In September 1918, during the suppression of peasant uprisings in Slavgorod county, Annenkov tortured and killed up to 500 people. The village of Black Dole was burned down, after which peasants were tortured and shot, including the wives and children of the peasants. Girls of Slavgorod and surrounding areas were brought to Annenkov's train, raped, and then shot. According to an eyewitness, Annenkov behaved with brutal torture: victims had their eyes gouged and tongues and strips of their back cut off, were buried alive, or tied to horses. In Semipalatinsk, Annenkov threatened to shoot every fifth resident if the city refused to pay indemnities.

On May 9, 1918, after Ataman Dutov captured Alexandrov Gay village, nearly 2,000 men of the Red Army were buried alive. More than 700 people from the village were executed. After capturing Troitsk, Orenburg, and other cities, a regime of terror was installed over 6,000 people, of whom 500 were killed just during interrogations. In Chelyabinsk, Dutov's men executed or deported to Siberian prisons over 9,000 people. In Troitsk, Dutov's men in the first weeks after the capture of the city shot about 700 people. In Ileka they killed over 400. These mass executions were typical of Dutov's Cossack troops. Dutov's executive order of August 4, 1918, imposed the death penalty for evasion of military service and for even passive resistance to authorities on its territory. In one district of the Ural region in January 1918, Dutov's men killed over 1,000 people. On April 3, 1919, the Cossack warlord ordered his troops to shoot and take hostages for the slightest display of opposition. In the village of Sugar, Dutov's men burned down a hospital with hundreds of Red Army patients.

The Semenov regime in Transbaikalia was characterized by mass terror and executions. More than 1,600 people were shot. Semenov himself admitted in court that his troops burned villages. Eleven permanent death houses were set up, where refined forms of torture were practiced. Semyonov personally supervised the torture chambers, during which some 6,500 people were murdered.

Major General William S. Graves, who commanded North-American occupation forces in Siberia, testified that:

Semeonoff and Kalmikoff soldiers, under the protection of Japanese troops, were roaming the country like wild animals, killing and robbing the people, and these murders could have been stopped any day Japan wished. If questions were asked about these brutal murders, the reply was that the people murdered were Bolsheviks and this explanation, apparently, satisfied the world. Conditions were represented as being horrible in Eastern Siberia, and that life was the cheapest thing there. There were horrible murders committed, but they were not committed by the Bolsheviks as the world believes. I am well on the side of safety when I say that the anti-Bolsheviks killed one hundred people in Eastern Siberia, to every one killed by the Bolsheviks.

== In literature ==
Many Soviet authors wrote about the heroism of the Russian people in combating the White Terror. Novels include Furmanov's Chapaev, Serafimovich's The Iron Flood, and Fadeyev's The Rout. Many of the early short stories and novels of Sholokhov, Leonov, and Fedin were devoted to this theme.

Nikolai Ostrovsky's autobiographical novel How the Steel was Tempered documents episodes of the White Terror in western Ukraine by anti-Soviet units.

In his book, Terrorism and Communism: A Reply to Karl Kautsky, Trotsky argued that the reign of terror began with the White Terror under the White Guard forces and the Bolsheviks responded with the Red Terror.

== Memorials to victims of the White Terror ==
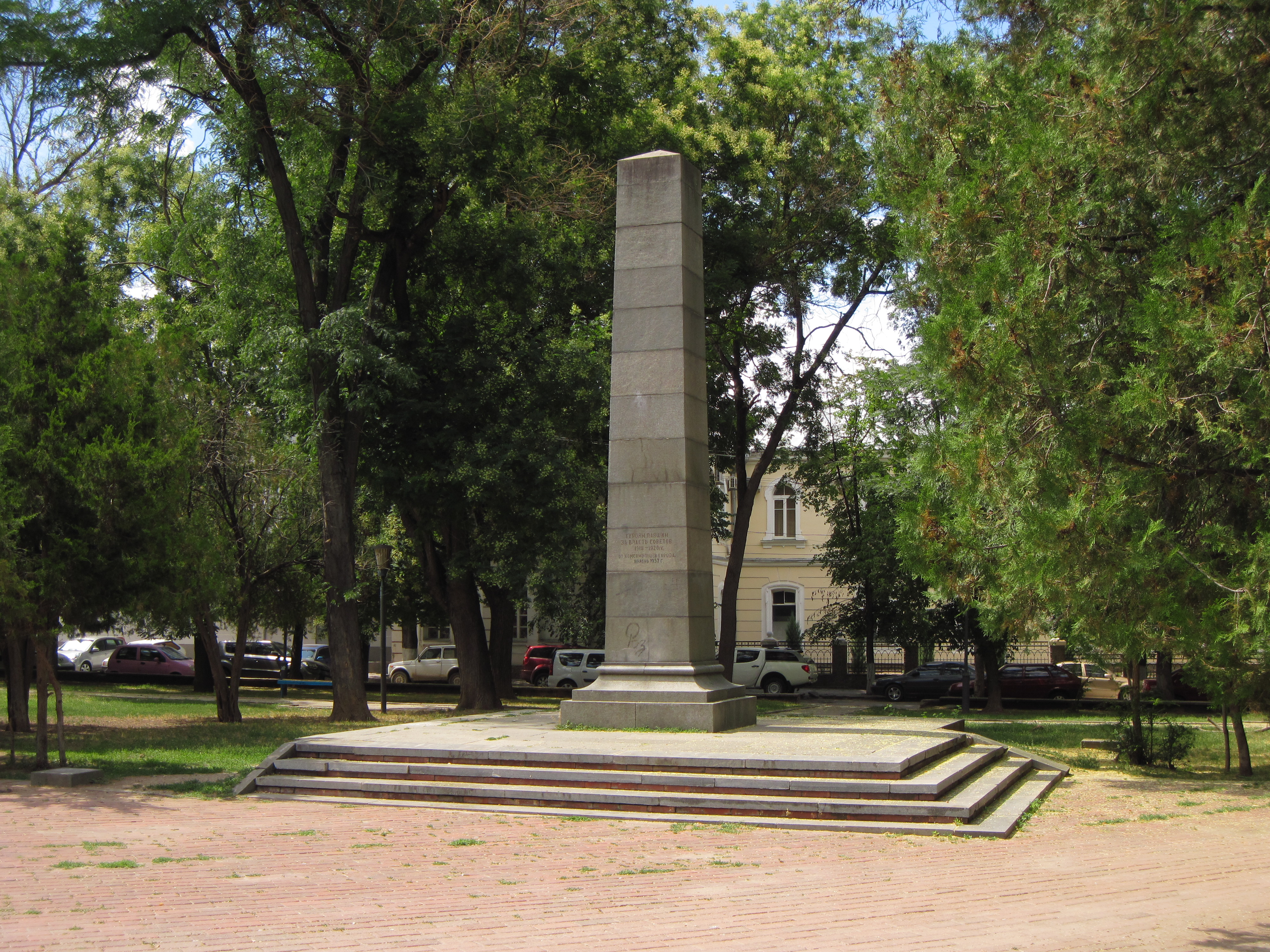
The remains of 100 victims of the White Terror are buried on a square in Simferopol.

During the Soviet period, a significant number of monuments were dedicated to victims of the White Terror. Most monuments were constructed in Russia, mainly as memorials or in visible places of towns and cities.

Since 1920, the central square in Tsaritsyn has been called the "Square of Fallen Fighters", where the remains of 55 victims of the White Terror are buried. A monument established in 1957 in black and red granite has an inscription: "To the freedom fighters of Red Tsaritsyn. Buried here are the heroic defenders of Red Tsaritsyn brutally tortured by White Guard butchers in 1919."

A monument to victims of the White Terror stands in Vyborg. It was erected in 1961 near the Leningrad Highway to commemorate 600 people shot by machine gun.

The "In Memory of Victims of the White Terror" monument in Voronezh is located in a park near the regional Nikitinskaia libraries. The monument was unveiled in 1920 on the site of public executions in 1919 by the troops of Mamantov.

In Sevastopol on the 15th Bastion Street, there is a "Communard Cemetery and victims of White terror". The cemetery is named in honor of the members of the Communist underground killed by the Whites in 1919–20.

In the city of Slavgorod in Altai Krai, there is a monument for participants of the Chernodolsky Uprising and their families who fell victim to the White terror of Ataman Annekov.

== See also ==
- Antisemitism in Ukraine
- Pogroms during the Russian Civil War
- Lenin's Hanging Order
- Red Terror
- Russian famine of 1921–22
- Russian Fascist Party
- Terrorism and the Soviet Union
- White Terror (disambiguation)
