= Assassination attempts on Vladimir Lenin =

Several assassination attempts are known to have been made against the Bolshevik communist revolutionary leader Vladimir Lenin. The most famous of them was committed on August 30, 1918, by the Socialist Revolutionary Party member Fanny Kaplan, as a result of which Lenin was seriously wounded. The early Soviet secret police force, the All-Russian Extraordinary Commission (commonly known as the Cheka), participated in the investigation and thwarting of a number of these attempts.

== Direct assassination attempts ==
=== January 1918 ===
On January 1, 1918, the first unsuccessful attempt on Lenin's life took place in Petrograd, in which Friedrich Platten was slightly hit by a bullet. According to one of the versions of the event given by the Cheka, Dmitry Shakhovskoy was the organizer of the assassination attempt on January 1, 1918. A few years later, while in exile, Prince Dmitry Shakhovskoy announced that he was the organizer of the assassination attempt and allocated five hundred thousand rubles for this purpose. Researcher Richard Pipes also pointed out that one of the former ministers of the Provisional Government, constitutional democrat Nikolai Nekrasov, who, immediately after the assassination attempt, changed his last name to Golgofsky, left for Ufa, and then to Kazan, was involved in this attempt. In March 1921, he was arrested, sent to Moscow, and in May, after a meeting with Lenin, was released.

In mid–January, the second attempt on Lenin's life was thwarted in Petrograd: the soldier Spiridonov came to see Mikhail Bonch–Bruevich, declaring that he was participating in the conspiracy of the "Union of Saint George's Cavaliers" and was ordered to eliminate Lenin. On the night of January 22, the Cheka arrested the conspirators at 14 Zakharyevskaya Street, in the apartment of "citizen Salova", but then they are all sent to the front at their personal request. At least two of the conspirators, Zinkevich and Nekrasov, subsequently joined the "white" armies.

=== March 1918 ===
On March 11, 1918, the Bolsheviks moved the capital from Petrograd to Moscow, fearing the expected German offensive. The move of government bodies took place in difficult conditions: as of March 11, the sabotage of the railway workers was still not completely broken. To divert eyes, the move was announced on March 11, however, in fact, the move began one day earlier, on March 10 at 21:45, and was guarded by Latvian Riflemen under the command of Berezin.

On its way, the train with Lenin met with a train with armed deserters coming from the front. At the station Malaya Vishera there was a clash of deserters numbering up to 400 sailors and 200 soldiers with numerically superior Latvian Riflemen. The Latvians disarmed the deserters and blocked the "anarchist train". Historian Richard Pipes, in his work "Bolsheviks in the Struggle for Power", described this incident as follows: "The company was traveling on a special train, guarded by Latvian Riflemen. Early in the morning they came across a train filled with deserters, and since the intentions of the latter were unclear, Bonch–Bruevich ordered the train to stop and disarm everyone. Then the train moved on and arrived in Moscow late in the evening".

=== August 1918 ===
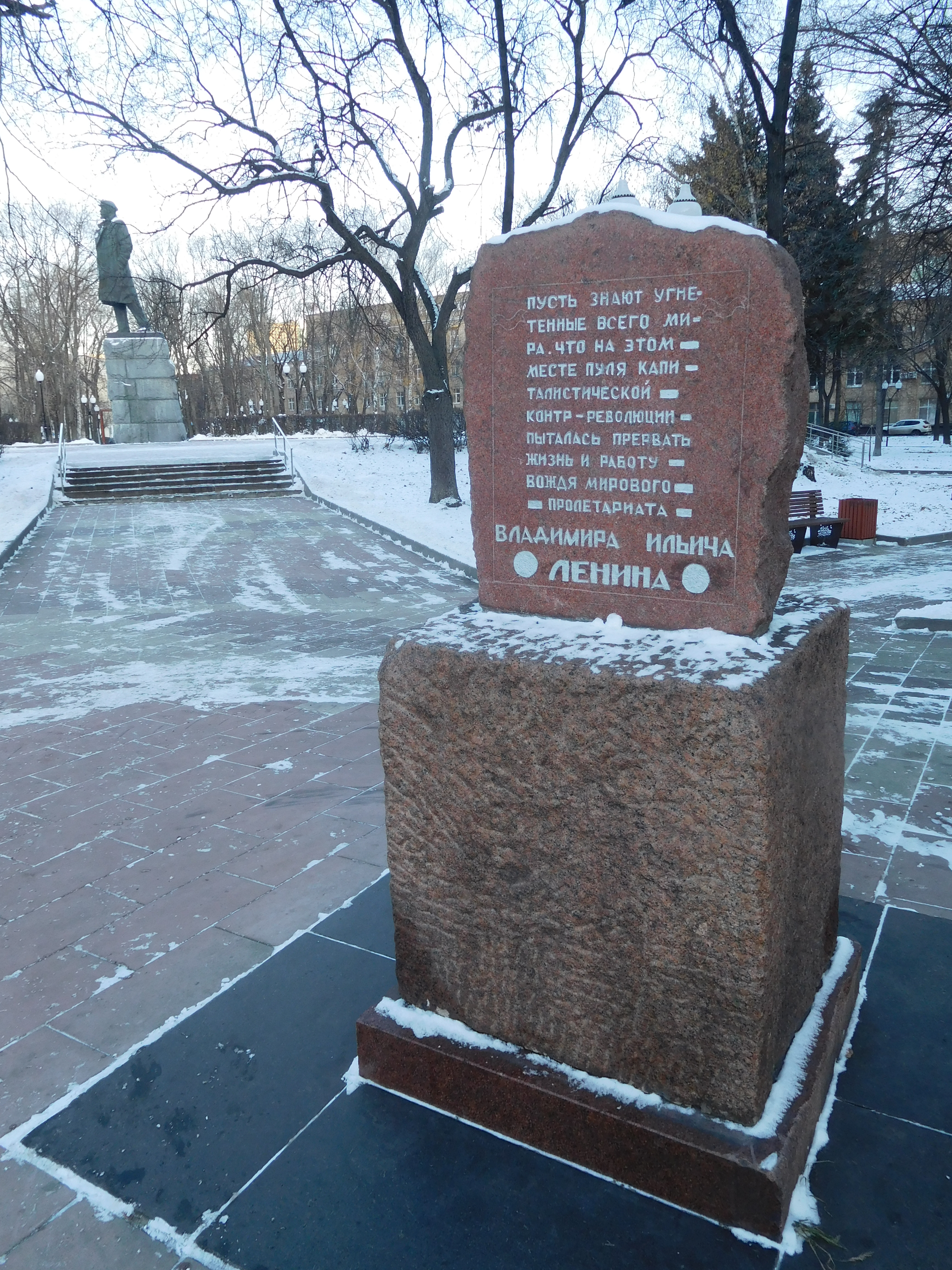
Memorial stone at the site of the 1918 attempt on Lenin's life

On August 30, 1918, at the Michelson Plant in Moscow, an attempt was made on Lenin, according to the official version, by the half–blind Socialist Revolutionary Fanny Kaplan. As a result of the assassination attempt, Lenin was seriously wounded (the question of the organizers and participants in the assassination attempt, as well as the involvement of Fanny Kaplan, remains unclear to this day).

On the morning of August 30, 1918, the Chairman of the Petrograd Extraordinary Commission, Moisey Uritsky, was killed in Petrograd. Despite the news of this murder, no additional security measures were taken in Moscow. The speeches of the members of the Council of People's Commissars at the factory rallies, scheduled for 18:00, were not canceled. Lenin was supposed to speak at a rally in front of the workers of the Michelson Plant. He left for the plant without security. There was no security at the plant itself. Lenin's speech at the rally ended with the words: "We will die or win!". When Lenin left the plant and was getting into the car, a woman, approached him with a complaint that bread was being confiscated at the railway stations. When Lenin turned towards her, she fired three shots with a Browning FN M1900 pistol.

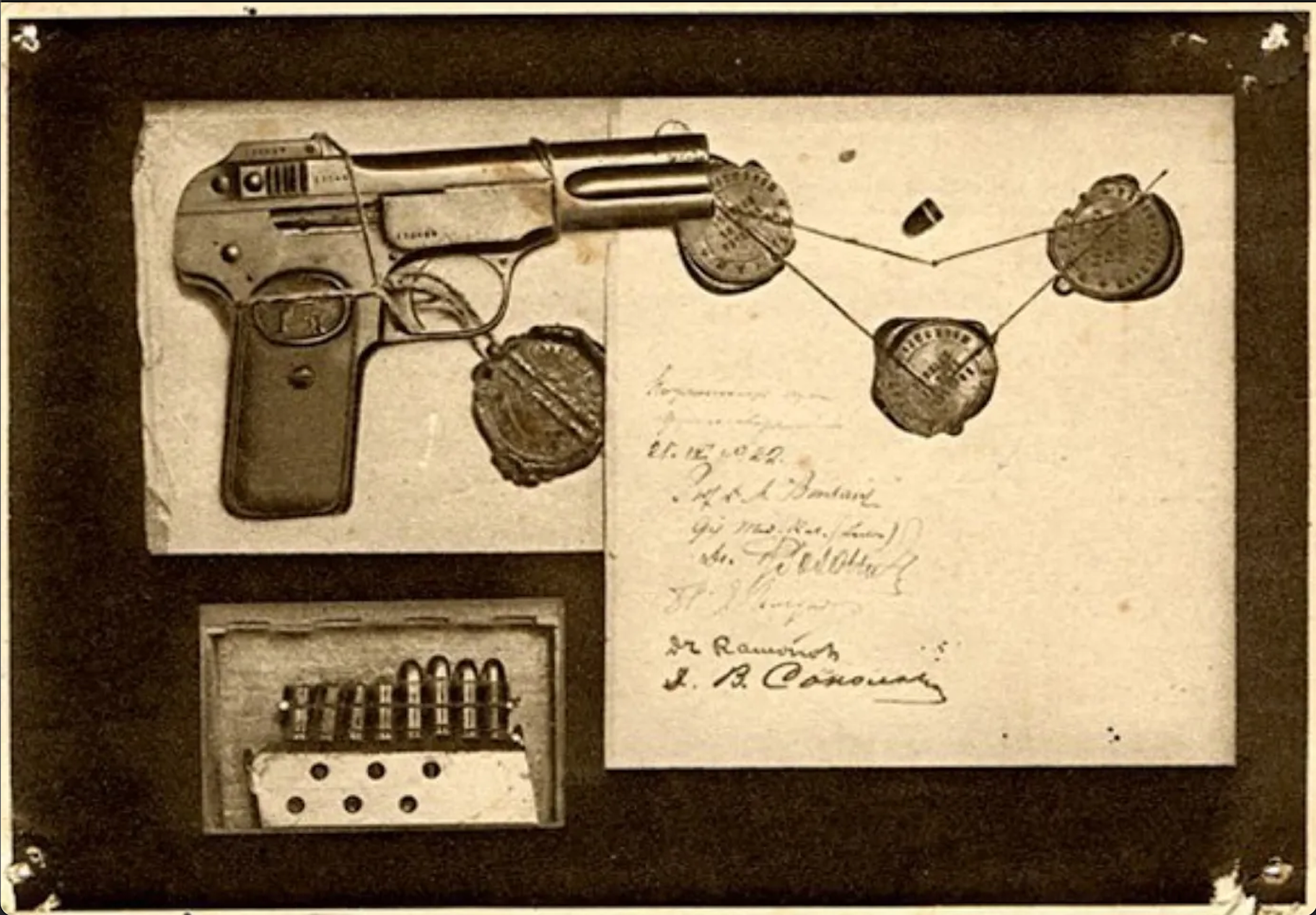
Fanny Kaplan's FN 1900 pistol, used in the attempted assassination of Lenin

Lenin's driver, Stepan Gil, rushed after the unknown shooter, but after a while she stopped of her own accord, was arrested and taken to Lubyanka.

Lenin was left unconscious immediately after the assassination attempt. Doctors discovered that he had a dangerous wound in the neck under the jaw, and blood entered his lung. The second bullet hit his arm, and the third hit the woman who was talking to Lenin at the moment the shots began. Investigators in the Cheka established that the unknown is a former anarchist Fanny Kaplan, who before the revolution was involved in the assassination attempt on the Kiev Governor–General. In exile she joined the Socialist Revolutionaries. By her own admission, Kaplan sympathized with the regime of the Committee of Members of the Constituent Assembly and the leader of the Socialist Revolutionaries Chernov, and she decided to kill Lenin as revenge for the dispersal of the Constituent Assembly. She was quoted as saying: "I shot Lenin because I consider him a traitor. Due to the fact that he lives for a long time, the onset of socialism is postponed for decades."

==== Information made public by the Soviet government ====
The details of the assassination attempt were based on what authorities decided to report to the public in early 1922 only after the Bolshevik government held the first open political trial of the leaders of the Socialist Revolutionary Party (SR). At the trial, the repentant SR militants Grigory Semyonov and Lydia Konopleva testified. In accordance with Semyonov's testimony, the SR Combat Organization resumed its activities in early 1918 and in July liquidated V. Volodarsky. The next main target was Leon Trotsky, the military leader of Bolshevism. Trotsky was constantly moving between the capital and the front and "for technical reasons" (as Semyonov put it) it was decided to first eliminate Lenin. Semyonov discovered that Kaplan, whom he described as an "unshakable revolutionary terrorist", was independently conducting the same training as him and had her join his group. During interrogations conducted by the Cheka, Kaplan claimed that she acted independently without representing any party.

The first assassination attempt was made by the Socialist Revolutionaries on August 16 at a meeting of the Moscow Party Committee, but the perpetrator lost his nerve at the last moment. The second and nearly successful attempt was made on August 30 where Semyonov appointed Novikov as the worker on duty and Kaplan as the executor. At the same time, the Socialist Revolutionaries tried to carry out an attempt on Trotsky's life by blowing up the front of his train. At the last moment, Trotsky eluded them by leaving on another train.

==== Poisoned bullet version ====
For a long time there was an opinion that Lenin was wounded by a poisoned bullet. In particular, the historian Richard Pipes cites such a statement in his work "Bolsheviks in the Struggle for Power", referring to the testimony of Semyonov. Semyonov himself claimed that the three bullets had a cruciform incision into which curare poison was injected. In addition, according to the medical report, the doctors actually found a cruciform incision on the bullet removed from Lenin's neck. Assuming that the poison was actually inflicted, its properties were destroyed by the heat generated in the pistol barrel upon firing.

In the future, a controversy grew around this version, in which Lenin's political opponents tried to deny both the poisoned bullets and the existence of the attempt itself.

==== Results of the assassination attempt ====
As a result of the assassination attempts on Vladimir Lenin and Moisey Uritsky, the supreme body of Soviet power – the All–Russian Central Executive Committee, chaired by Yakov Sverdlov, announced the beginning of the Red Terror. The Council of People's Commissars – the Soviet government – on September 5, 1918, confirmed this decision by a special resolution.

In September 1918, Trotsky rushed back from the far-eastern front of the civil war and reached Moscow after the second day of the shooting whereas Stalin remained in Tsaritsyn.

Although Lenin's wound seemed fatal, he recovered quickly. On September 25, 1918, he left for Gorki and returned to Moscow on October 14, immediately resuming his political activities. Lenin's first public appearance after the assassination attempt was on October 22, 1918.

== Indirect assassination attempts ==
=== Robbery ===
On January 6, 1919, Kuznetsov's gang accidentally robbed a car with Lenin inside. Lenin had been driving to Nadezhda Krupskaya (according to the version in numerous stories – to a Christmas tree) at the Forestry School in Sokolniki. As described by Angelica Balabanova, "[o]ne of them took out a pistol and said: 'Wallet or life!' Lenin showed his identity card and said: 'I am Ulyanov–Lenin.' The attackers did not even look at the document and only repeated: 'Wallet or life!' Lenin had no money. He took off his coat, got out of the car and, without giving the robbers a bottle of milk, which was intended for his wife, went further on foot."

=== Attempted terrorist attacks ===
According to researcher Viktor Savchenko, an underground anarchist group led by Maria Nikiforova ("Marusya") in the summer of 1919 began to develop plans to assassinate Lenin and Trotsky. After a series of "expropriations", the anarchists, under the slogan of starting a "dynamite war with the Council of People's Commissars and the Extraordinary Commission", blew up the building of the Moscow Party Committee on September 25, 1919, in which Lenin was expected to speak. Lenin was late for the opening of the plenum of the party committee, and did not suffer in any way. During the terrorist act, the Chairman of the Party Committee Vladimir Zagorsky and 11 other people were killed, while Nikolai Bukharin, Yemelyan Yaroslavsky, and a number of other prominent Bolshevik leaders, a total of 55 people, were wounded as part of the explosion in Leontievsky Lane.

On the October Holidays of 1919, the anarchists planned to blow up the Kremlin, but the entire organization was opened by the Cheka and almost all were arrested, seven people were shot. Nikiforova herself ("Marusya") by this time had already been hanged by the White Guards in Sevastopol; presumably she was going to blow up General Denikin's headquarters.
