= Lenin's hanging order =

Execution request from Vladimir Lenin

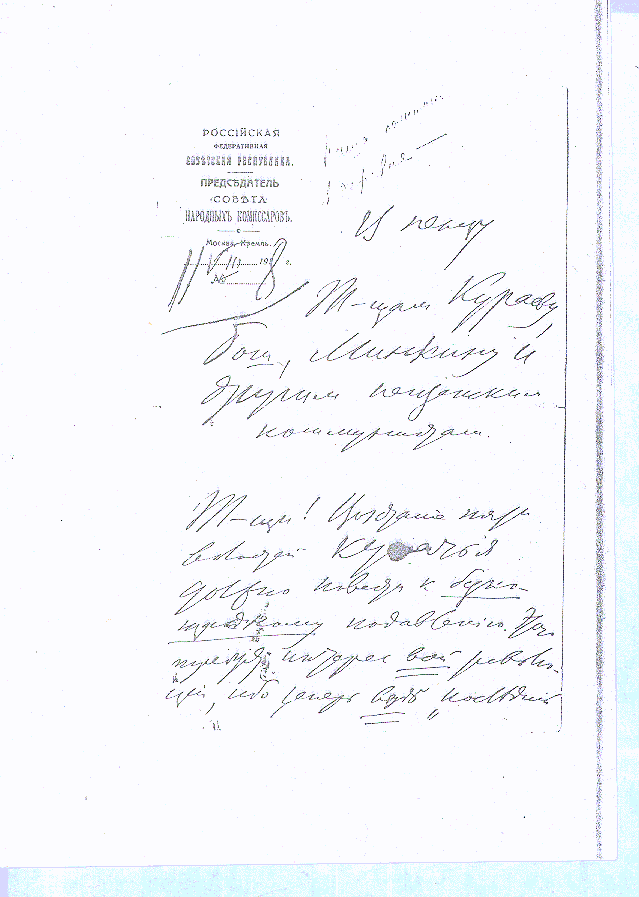
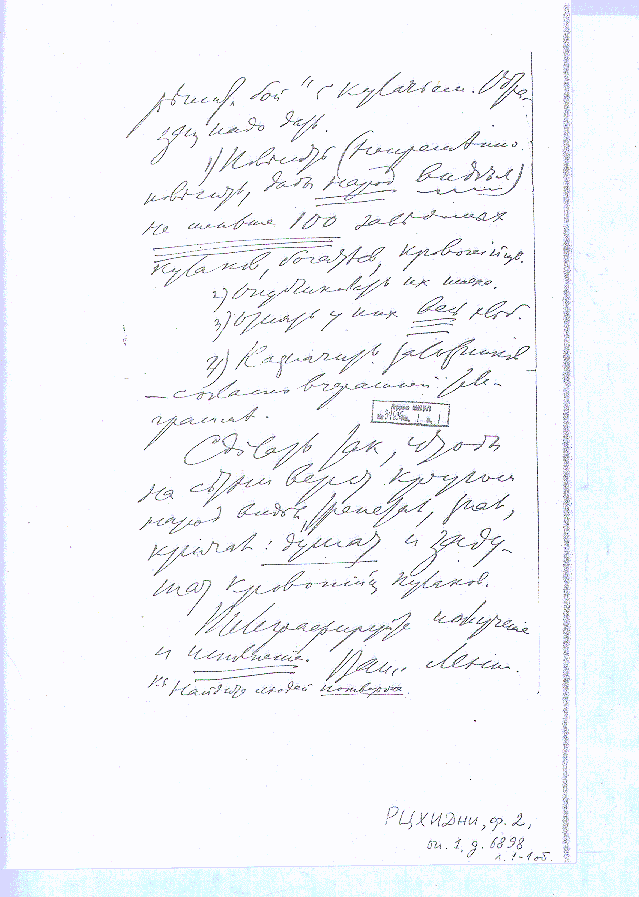
The first and second pages of Lenin's telegram, called "hanging order"

"Lenin's hanging order" is a telegram from Bolshevik leader Vladimir Lenin demanding the suppression and execution of captured participants in the kulak revolt in the Penza Governorate. It was first called the "Hanging Order" by the U.S. Library of Congress; the "order" was not carried out as such, and the revolt was ended relatively peacefully.

The telegram was addressed to Vasily Kuraev (Penza Soviet chairman), Yevgenia Bosch (the chairwoman of Penza Governorate Party Committee) and Aleksandr Minkin (the chairman of Penza Governorate ispolkom) and other Penza communists, dated 11 August 1918.

== Historical background ==
During the summer of 1918, many of Russia's central cities, including Moscow and Petrograd, were cut off from the grain-producing regions of Ukraine, northern Caucasus, and Siberia by the civil war. In addition to Soviet "war communism" policies, this caused hundreds of thousands of people to reach the brink of starvation. The Penza Governorate was tasked with providing food to the cities and the government implemented measures, such as prodrazvyorstka (food requisitioning), to collect grain from peasants. The Central Committee sent Yevgenia Bosch to supervise grain collection.

Lenin had justified the state response to kulak revolts due to the 258 uprisings that had occurred in 1918 and the threat of the White Terror. He summarised his view that either the “kulaks massacre vast numbers of workers, or the workers ruthlessly suppress the revolt of the predatory kulak minority… There can be no middle course”. Concurrently, Old Bolshevik Anatoly Lunacharsky had also informed Lenin of several brutal executions of Bolsheviks by the peasants in Kostroma.

A peasant revolt erupted in the Kuchkino Volost of Penzensky Uyezd on 5 August 1918, in opposition to prodrazvyorstka, and soon spread to neighbouring regions. While Penza Soviet chairman Kurayev opposed the use of military force and argued that propaganda efforts would be sufficient, Bosch insisted on using the military and mass executions. By 8 August 1918, Soviet forces had crushed the revolt, but the situation in the governorate remained tense, and a revolt led by members of Socialist Revolutionary Party erupted in the town of Chembar on 18 August. Lenin sent several telegrams to Penza demanding harsher measures in fighting these kulak, kulak-supporting peasants and Left SR insurrectionists.

== 11 August 1918 cable ==
One telegram (dated 11 August 1918) instructed the Communists operating in the Penza area to publicly hang at least one hundred kulaks, to publicize their names, to confiscate their grain, and to designate a number of hostages. This instruction was not carried out as an order: only the 13 organizers of the murder of local authorities and the uprising were arrested, while the uprising ended as propaganda activities were held there.

Lenin's so-called "Hanging Order" was discussed during a controversy about the BBC documentary Lenin's Secret Files (1997) based upon Robert Service's findings in Soviet archives.

This is a translation of the Russian original:

"Comrades! The insurrection of five kulak districts should be ruthlessly suppressed. The interests of the whole revolution require this because 'the last decisive battle' (Note: a paraphrase of the first line of the refrain from The Internationale) with the kulaks is now underway everywhere. An example must be made.

1. Hang (absolutely hang, in full view of the people) no fewer than one hundred known kulaks, fatcats, bloodsuckers.
2. Publish their names.
3. Seize all grain from them.
4. Designate hostages - in accordance with yesterday's telegram.

Do it in such a fashion, that for hundreds of verst around the people see, tremble, know, shout: "the bloodsucking kulaks are being strangled and will be strangled".

Telegraph the receipt and implementation. Yours, Lenin.

P.S. Find some truly hard men."

== See also ==
- Bibliography of the Russian Revolution and Civil War
- Outline of the Russian Revolution and Civil War
- Index of articles related to the Russian Revolution and Civil War
- White Terror (Russia)
- Preventive repression
- Mass killings under communist regimes
