= Ronald Hingley =

English scholar and translator (1920–2010)

- Born: Ronald Francis Hingley; April 26, 1920; Edinburgh, Scotland
- Died: May 6, 2010
- Education: University of Oxford
- Occupations: Historian; translator; literary scholar
- Known for: Oxford Chekhov translations, Russian biographies
- Notable work: A New Life of Anton Chekhov, The Russian Mind

Ronald Francis Hingley (26 April 1920 – 23 January 2010) was an English scholar, translator and historian of Russia, specializing in Russian history and literature.

Hingley was the translator and editor of the nine-volume collection of Chekhov's works published by Oxford University Press between 1974 and 1980 (known as the Oxford Chekhov). He also wrote numerous books including biographies of Chekhov, Dostoyevsky, Stalin and Boris Pasternak. He won the James Tait Black Award for his 1976 biography A New Life of Anton Chekhov. He also translated several works of Russian literature, among them Alexander Solzhenitsyn's classic One Day in the Life of Ivan Denisovich which Hingley co-translated with Max Hayward.

He was a governing body fellow of St Antony's College, Oxford, from 1961 to 1987 and an emeritus fellow from 1987 onwards.

== Selected works ==
- The Undiscovered Dostoyevsky (1962)
- Nihilists: Russian Radicals and Revolutionaries in the Reign of Alexander II (1855-81) (1967)
- The Tsars: Russian Autocrats, 1533-1917 (1968)
- The Russian Secret Police: Muscovite, Imperial Russian and Soviet Political Security Operations (1970)
- Russian Revolution (Bodley Head Contemporary History) (1970)
- A Concise History of Russia (1972)
- A People in Turmoil: Revolutions in Russia (1973)
- Joseph Stalin: Man and Legend (Leaders of Our Time) (1974)
- A New Life of Anton Chekhov (1976)
- Russian Writers and Society in the Nineteenth Century (1977)
- Dostoyevsky, His Life and Work (1978)
- The Russian Mind (1978) - "An extensive, anecdotal exploration of the Russian mind and character portrays salient behavior traits and attitudes and examines characteristic social and cultural phenomena."
- Russian Writers and Soviet Society, 1917-1978 (1979)
- Nightingale Fever: Russian Poets in Revolution (1981)
- Pasternak (1983)
- A Life of Chekhov (Oxford Lives) (1989)
- Russia: A Concise History (1991)
