= Cheka =

Soviet secret police (1917–1922)

All-Russian Extraordinary Commission
- Всероссийская чрезвычайная комиссия (Russian)
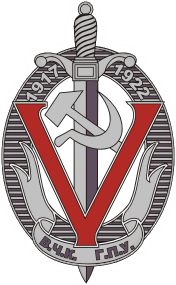
- Badge commemorating 5 years of the Cheka–GPU

Agency overview
- Formed: 20 December 1917; 108 years ago
- Dissolved: 6 February 1922; 104 years ago
- Superseding agency: State Political Directorate
- Type: Secret police; intelligence agency
- Headquarters: 2 Gorokhovaya Street, Petrograd; Lubyanka Building, Moscow
- Agency executives: Felix Dzerzhinsky (1917–1918); Jēkabs Peterss (1918) (acting); Felix Dzerzhinsky (1918–1922)
- Parent agency: Council of People's Commissars

The All-Russian Extraordinary Commission, (Note: (Russian: Всероссийская чрезвычайная комиссия, romanized: Vserossiyskaya chrezvychaynaya komissiya IPA: [fsʲɪrɐˈsʲijskəjə tɕrʲɪzvɨˈtɕæjnəjə kɐˈmʲisʲɪjə]) abbreviated as VChK (Russian: ВЧК IPA: [vɛ tɕe ˈka]), and commonly known as the Cheka (Russian: ЧК IPA: [tɕɪˈka]), was the first Soviet secret police organization. It was established on 20 December [O.S. 7 December] 1917 by the Council of People's Commissars of the Russian SFSR, and was led by Felix Dzerzhinsky. By the end of the Russian Civil War in 1922, the Cheka had at least 200,000 personnel.

Ostensibly created to protect the October Revolution from class enemies such as the bourgeoisie and members of the clergy, the Cheka soon became a tool of repression wielded against all political opponents of the Bolshevik regime. The organization had responsibility for counterintelligence, oversight of the loyalty of the Red Army, and protection of the country's borders, as well as the collection of human and technical intelligence. At the direction of Vladimir Lenin, the Cheka performed mass arrests, imprisonments, torture, and executions without trial in what came to be known as the "Red Terror". It policed the Gulag system of labor camps, conducted requisitions of food, and put down rebellions by workers and peasants. The Cheka was responsible for executing at least 50,000 to as many as 200,000 people, though estimates vary widely.

The Cheka, the first in a long succession of Soviet secret police agencies, established the security service as a major player in Soviet politics. It was dissolved in February 1922, and succeeded by the State Political Directorate (GPU). Throughout the Soviet era, members of the secret police were referred to as "Chekists".

== Name ==
The official designation was All-Russian Extraordinary (or Emergency) Commission for Combating Counter-Revolution and Sabotage under the Council of People's Commissars of the RSFSR (Russian: Всероссийская чрезвычайная комиссия по борьбе с контрреволюцией и саботажем при Совете народных комиссаров РСФСР, romanized: Vserossiyskaya chrezvychaynaya komissiya po borbe s kontrrevolyutsiyey i sabotazhem pri Sovete narodnykh komisarov RSFSR).

In 1918, its name was changed, becoming All-Russian Extraordinary Commission for Combating Counter-Revolution, Profiteering and Corruption.

A member of Cheka was called a chekist (Russian: чеки́ст, romanized: chekíst IPA: [t͡ɕɪˈkʲist]). Also, the term chekist often referred to Soviet secret police throughout the Soviet period, despite official name changes over time. In The Gulag Archipelago, Alexander Solzhenitsyn recalls that zeks in the labor camps used old chekist as a mark of special esteem for particularly experienced camp administrators. The term is still found in use in Russia today (for example, President Vladimir Putin has been referred to in the Russian media as a chekist due to his career in the KGB and as head of the KGB's successor, FSB).

The Chekists commonly dressed in black leather, including long flowing coats, reportedly after being issued such distinctive coats early in their existence. Western communists adopted this clothing fashion. The Chekists also often carried with them Greek-style worry beads made of amber, which had become "fashionable among high officials during the time of the 'cleansing'".

== History ==
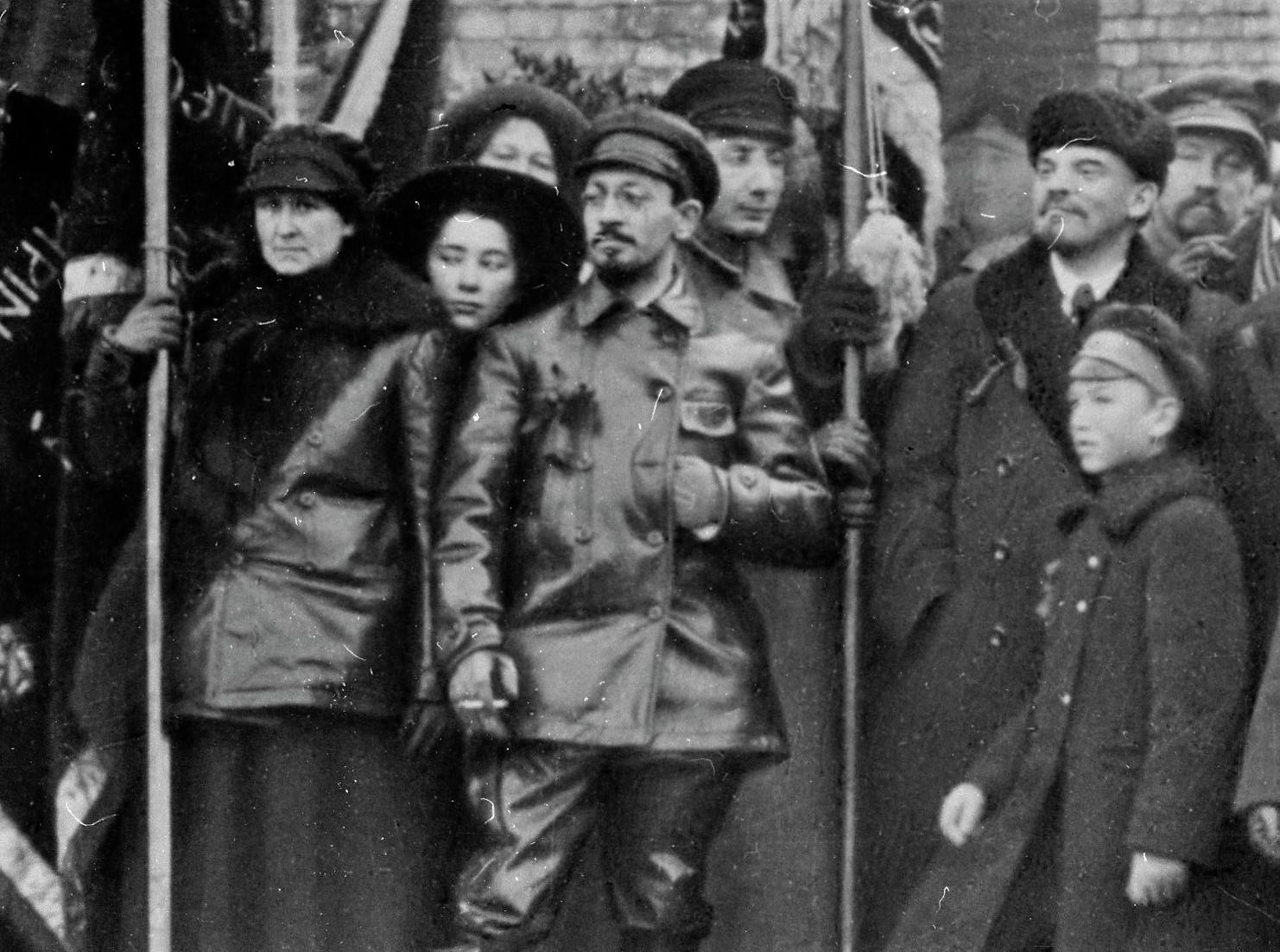
Chekists frequently dressed in black leather, allegedly following the example of Yakov Sverdlov (pictured here in 1918).

In 1921, the Troops for the Internal Defense of the Republic (a branch of the Cheka) numbered at least 200,000. These troops policed labor camps, ran the Gulag system, conducted requisitions of food, and subjected political opponents to secret arrest, detention, torture and summary execution. They also put down rebellions and riots by workers or peasants, and mutinies in the desertion-plagued Red Army.

After 1922, Cheka groups underwent the first of a series of reorganizations; however the theme of a government dominated by "the organs" persisted indefinitely afterward, and Soviet citizens continued to refer to members of the various organs as Chekists.

The Cheka was largely controlled by people who came from well off backgrounds and from a diverse set of ethnicities. Eleven of the top twenty ranking Chekists were of the bourgeoisie or bourgeoisie-intelligentsia origin, one came from a family of wealthy landowners, two came from families of the industrial proletariat, only three were peasants, and three have unknown backgrounds. Six of the twenty were ethnic Russians, three were Polish Jews, three were Latvians, two were ethnic Poles, one was Ukrainian, one was an Azerbaijani Jew, one was Georgian, one was Armenian, one was a Russified Greek, and one was a Lithuanian Jew.

=== Creation ===
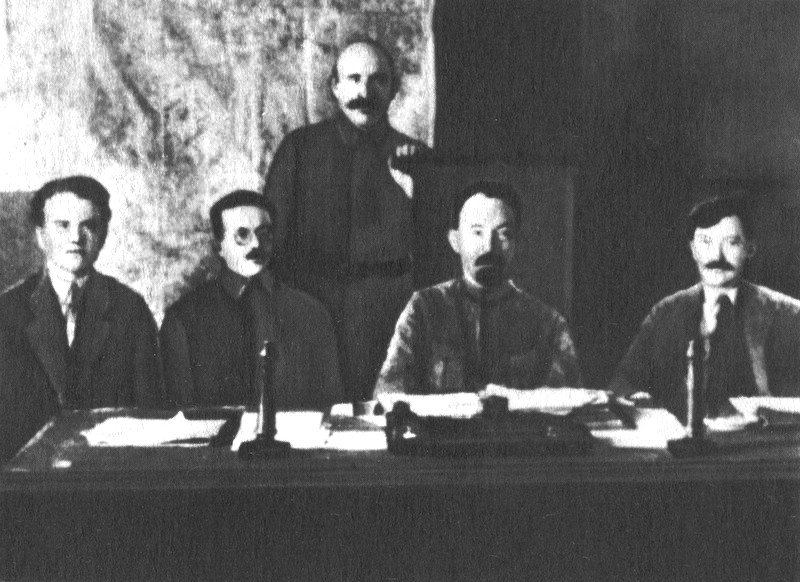
Members of the presidium of VCheKa (left to right) Yakov Peters, Józef Unszlicht, Abram Belenky (standing), Felix Dzerzhinsky, Vyacheslav Menzhinsky, 1921

In the first month and a half after the October Revolution (1917), the duty of "extinguishing the resistance of exploiters" was assigned to the Petrograd Military Revolutionary Committee (or PVRK). It represented a temporary body working under directives of the Council of People's Commissars (Sovnarkom) and Central Committee of RSDRP(b). The VRK created new bodies of government, organized food delivery to cities and the Army, requisitioned products from bourgeoisie, and sent its emissaries and agitators into provinces. One of its most important functions was the security of revolutionary order, and the fight against counterrevolutionary activity (see: Anti-Soviet agitation).

On December 1, 1917, the All-Russian Central Executive Committee (VTsIK or TsIK) reviewed a proposed reorganization of the VRK, and possible replacement of it. On December 5, the Petrograd VRK published an announcement of dissolution and transferred its functions to the department of TsIK for the fight against "counterrevolutionaries". On December 6, the Council of People's Commissars (Sovnarkom) strategized how to persuade government workers to strike against counter-revolution across Russia. They decided that a special commission was needed to implement the "most energetically revolutionary" measures. Felix Dzerzhinsky (the Iron Felix) was appointed as Director and invited the participation of the following individuals: V. K. Averin, I. K. Ksenofontov, S. K. Ordzhonikidze, Ya. Kh. Peters, K. A. Peterson, V. A. Trifonov, I. S. Unshlikht, V. N. Vasilevsky, V. N. Yakovleva, V. V. Yakovlev, D. G. Yevseyev, N. A. Zhydelev.

On December 7, 1917, all of those invited except Zhydelev and Vasilevsky gathered in the Smolny Institute with Dzerzhinsky to discuss the competence and structure of the commission to combat counterrevolution and sabotage. The obligations of the commission were: "to liquidate to the root all of the counterrevolutionary and sabotage activities and all attempts to them in all of Russia, to hand over counter-revolutionaries and saboteurs to the revolutionary tribunals, develop measures to combat them and relentlessly apply them in real-world applications. The commission should only conduct a preliminary investigation". The commission should also observe the press and counterrevolutionary parties, sabotaging officials and other criminals.

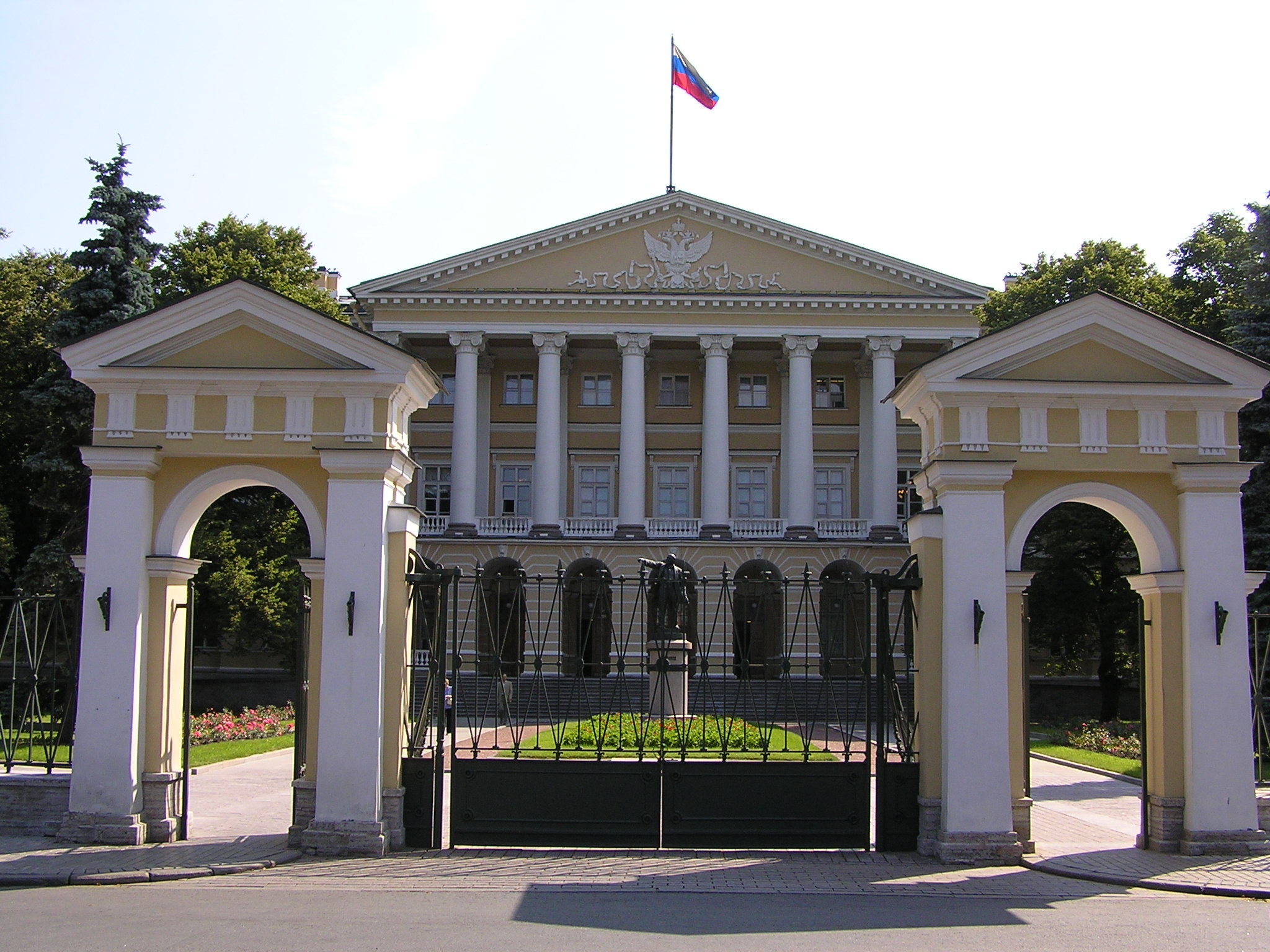
Smolny, the seat of the Soviet government in 1917 (pictured in 2004)

Three sections were created: informational, organizational, and a unit to combat counter-revolution and sabotage. Upon the end of the meeting, Dzerzhinsky reported to the Sovnarkom with the requested information. The commission was allowed to apply such measures of repression as 'confiscation, deprivation of ration cards, publication of lists of enemies of the people etc.'". That day, Sovnarkom officially confirmed the creation of VCheKa. The commission was created not under the VTsIK as was previously anticipated, but rather under the Council of the People's Commissars.

On December 8, 1917, some of the original members of the Cheka were replaced. Averin, Ordzhonikidze, and Trifonov were replaced by V. V. Fomin, S. E. Shchukin, Ilyin, and Chernov. On the meeting of December 8, the presidium of VChK was elected of five members, and chaired by Dzerzhinsky. The issues of "speculation" or profiteering, such as by black market grain sellers and "corruption" was raised at the same meeting, which was assigned to Peters to address and report with results to one of the next meetings of the commission. A circular, published on 28 December [O.S. 15 December] 1917, gave the address of VCheka's first headquarters as "Petrograd, Gorokhovaya 2, 4th floor". On December 11, Fomin was ordered to organize a section to suppress "speculation." And in the same day, VCheKa offered Shchukin to conduct arrests of counterfeiters.

In January 1918, a subsection of the anti-counterrevolutionary effort was created to police bank officials. The structure of VCheKa was changing repeatedly. By March 1918, when the organization came to Moscow, it contained the following sections: against counterrevolution, speculation, non-residents, and information gathering. By the end of 1918–1919, some new units were created: secretly operative, investigatory, of transportation, military (special), operative, and instructional. By 1921, it changed once again, forming the following sections: directory of affairs, administrative-organizational, secretly operative, economical, and foreign affairs.

=== First months ===
In the first months of its existence, VCheKa consisted of only 40 officials. It commanded a team of soldiers, the Sveaborgesky regiment, as well as a group of Red Guardsmen. On January 14, 1918, Sovnarkom ordered Dzerzhinsky to organize teams of "energetic and ideological" sailors to combat speculation. By the spring of 1918, the commission had several teams: in addition to the Sveaborge team, it had an intelligence team, a team of sailors, and a strike team. Through the winter of 1917–1918, all activities of VCheKa were centralized mainly in the city of Petrograd. It was one of several other commissions in the country which fought against counterrevolution, speculation, banditry, and other activities perceived as crimes. Other organizations included: the Bureau of Military Commissars, and an Army-Navy investigatory commission to attack the counterrevolutionary element in the Red Army, plus the Central Requisite and Unloading Commission to fight speculation. The investigation of counterrevolutionary or major criminal offenses was conducted by the Investigatory Commission of Revtribunal. The functions of VCheKa were closely intertwined with the Commission of V. D. Bonch-Bruyevich, which beside the fight against wine pogroms was engaged in the investigation of most major political offenses (see: Bonch-Bruyevich Commission).

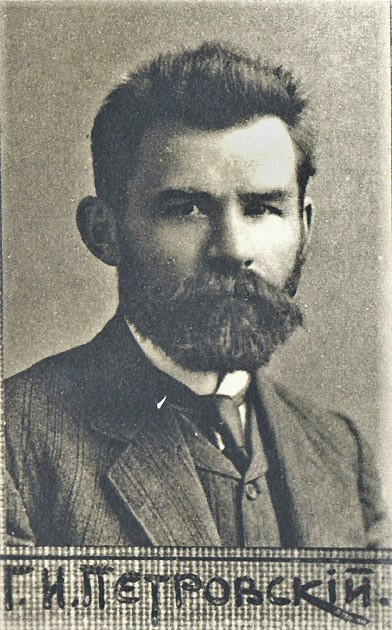
Grigory Petrovsky

All results of its activities, VCheKa had either to transfer to the Investigatory Commission of Revtribunal, or to dismiss. The control of the commission's activity was provided by the People's Commissariat for Justice (Narkomjust, at that time headed by Isaac Steinberg) and Internal Affairs (at that time headed by Grigory Petrovsky). Although the VCheKa was officially an independent organization from Internal Affairs, its chief members such as Dzerzhinsky, Latsis, Unszlicht, and Uritsky (all main chekists), since November 1917 composed the collegiate of Internal Affairs headed by Petrovsky. In November 1918, Petrovsky was appointed as head of the All-Ukrainian Central Military Revolutionary Committee during VCheKa's expansion to provinces and front-lines. At the time of political competition between Bolsheviks and SRs (January 1918), Left SRs attempted to curb the rights of VCheKa and establish through the Narkomiust their control over its work. Having failed in attempts to subordinate the VCheKa to Narkomiust, the Left SRs tried to gain control of the Extraordinary Commission in a different way: they requested that the Central Committee of the party be granted the right to directly enter their representatives into the VCheKa. Sovnarkom recognized the desirability of including five representatives of the Left Socialist-Revolutionary faction of VTsIK. Left SRs were granted the post of a companion (deputy) chairman of VCheKa. However, Sovnarkom, in which the majority belonged to the representatives of RSDLP(b) retained the right to approve members of the collegium of the VCheKa.

Originally, members of the Cheka were exclusively Bolshevik; however, in January 1918, Left SRs also joined the organization. The Left SRs were expelled or arrested later in 1918, following the attempted assassination of Lenin by an SR, Fanni Kaplan.

Latvians were significantly over-represented in the early years of the Cheka. 35.6% of the Moscow Cheka, 52.7% of Cheka senior officials and 54.3% of Cheka commissars in 1920 were Latvian. Jews comprised 3.7% of the Moscow Cheka, 4.3% of Cheka commissars, 8.6% of senior officials, 19.1% of investigators in the central office and 50% of those in the department for combatting counterrevolutionaries in 1918.

=== Consolidation of VCheKa and National Establishment ===
By the end of January 1918, the Investigatory Commission of Petrograd Soviet (probably same as of Revtribunal) petitioned Sovnarkom to delineate the role of detection and judicial-investigatory organs. It offered to leave, for the VCheKa and the Commission of Bonch-Bruyevich, only the functions of detection and suppression, while investigative functions entirely transferred to it. The Investigatory Commission prevailed. On January 31, 1918, Sovnarkom ordered to relieve VCheKa of the investigative functions, leaving for the commission only the functions of detection, suppression, and prevention of anti revolutionary crimes. At the meeting of the Council of People's Commissars on January 31, 1918, a merger of VCheKa and the Commission of Bonch-Bruyevich was proposed. The existence of both commissions, VCheKa of Sovnarkom and the Commission of Bonch-Bruyevich of VTsIK, with almost the same functions and equal rights, became impractical. A decision followed two weeks later.

On February 23, 1918, VCheKa sent a radio telegram to all Soviets with a petition to immediately organize emergency commissions to combat counter-revolution, sabotage and speculation, if such commissions had not been yet organized. February 1918 saw the creation of local Extraordinary Commissions. One of the first founded was the Moscow Cheka. Sections and commissariats to combat counterrevolution were established in other cities. The Extraordinary Commissions arose, usually in the areas during the moments of the greatest aggravation of political situation. On February 25, 1918, as the counterrevolutionary organization Union of Front-liners was making advances, the executive committee of the Saratov Soviet formed a counter-revolutionary section. On March 7, 1918, because of the move from Petrograd to Moscow, the Petrograd Cheka was created. On March 9, a section for combating counterrevolution was created under the Omsk Soviet. Extraordinary commissions were also created in Penza, Perm, Novgorod, Cherepovets, Rostov, Taganrog. On March 18, VCheKa adopted a resolution, The Work of VCheKa on the All-Russian Scale, foreseeing the formation everywhere of Extraordinary Commissions after the same model, and sent a letter that called for the widespread establishment of the Cheka in combating counterrevolution, speculation, and sabotage. Establishment of provincial Extraordinary Commissions was largely completed by August 1918. In the Soviet Republic, there were 38 gubernatorial Chekas (Gubcheks) by this time.

On June 12, 1918, the All-Russian Conference of Cheka adopted the Basic Provisions on the Organization of Extraordinary Commissions. They set out to form Extraordinary Commissions not only at Oblast and Guberniya levels, but also at the large Uyezd Soviets. In August 1918, in the Soviet Republic had accounted for some 75 Uyezd-level Extraordinary Commissions. By the end of the year, 365 Uyezd-level Chekas were established.

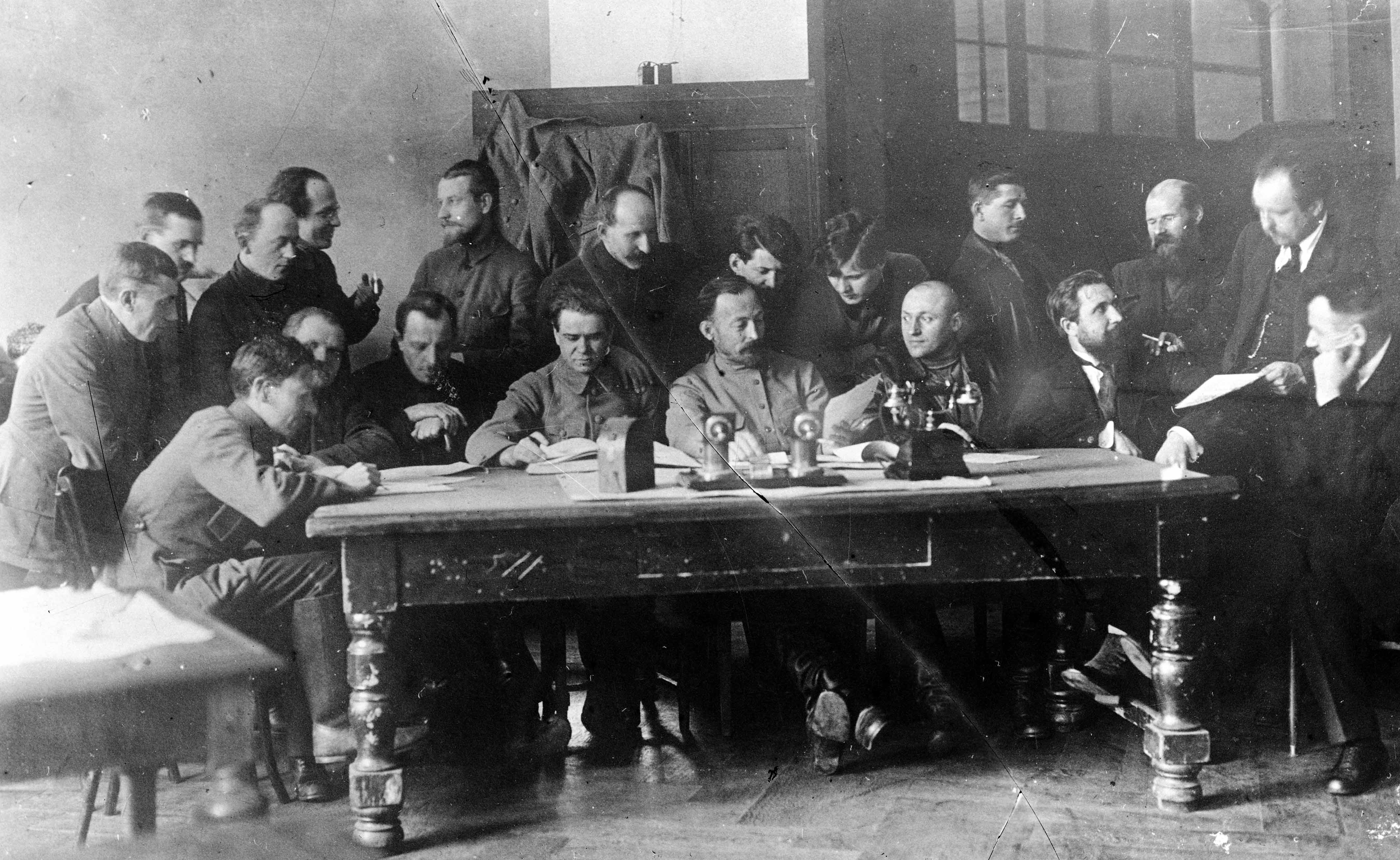
Felix Dzerzhinsky in a meeting among other members of the Presidium of the Cheka, 1919

In 1918, the All-Russia Extraordinary Commission and the Soviets managed to establish a local Cheka apparatus. It included Oblast, Guberniya, Raion, Uyezd, and Volost Chekas, with Raion and Volost Extraordinary Commissioners. In addition, border security Chekas were included in the system of local Cheka bodies.

In the autumn of 1918, as consolidation of the political situation of the republic continued, a move toward elimination of Uyezd-, Raion-, and Volost-level Chekas, as well as the institution of Extraordinary Commissions was considered. On January 20, 1919, VTsIK adopted a resolution prepared by VCheKa, On the abolition of Uyezd Extraordinary Commissions. On January 16 the presidium of VCheKa approved the draft on the establishment of the Politburo at Uyezd militsiya. This decision was approved by the Conference of the Extraordinary Commission IV, held in early February 1920.

=== Other types of Cheka ===
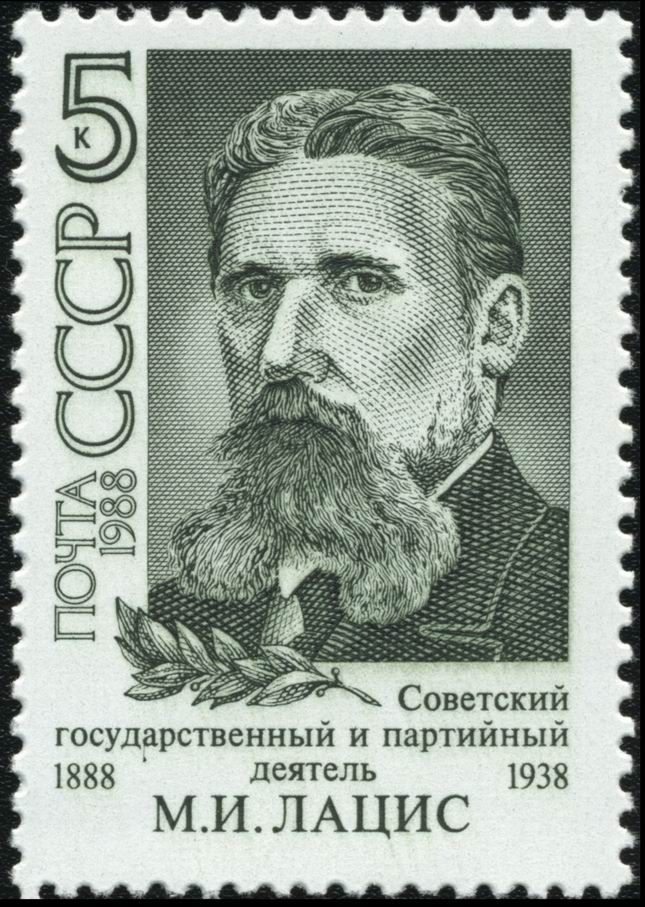
Portrait of Martin Latsis on a Soviet postage stamp

On August 3, a VCheKa section for combating counterrevolution, speculation and sabotage on railways was created. On August 7, 1918, Sovnarkom adopted a decree on the organization of the railway section at VCheKa. Combating counterrevolution, speculation, and crimes on railroads was passed under the jurisdiction of the railway section of VCheKa and local Cheka. In August 1918, railway sections were formed under the Gubcheks. Formally, they were part of the non-resident sections, but in fact constituted a separate division, largely autonomous in their activities. The gubernatorial and oblast-type Chekas retained in relation to the transportation sections only control and investigative functions.

The beginning of a systematic work of organs of VCheKa in RKKA refers to July 1918, the period of extreme tension of the civil war and class struggle in the country. On July 16, 1918, the Council of People's Commissars formed the Extraordinary Commission for combating counterrevolution at the Czechoslovak (Eastern) Front, led by M. I. Latsis. In the fall of 1918, Extraordinary Commissions to combat counterrevolution on the Southern (Ukraine) Front were formed. In late November, the Second All-Russian Conference of the Extraordinary Commissions accepted a decision after a report from I. N. Polukarov to establish at all frontlines, and army sections of the Cheka and granted them the right to appoint their commissioners in military units. On December 9, 1918, the collegiate (or presidium) of VCheKa had decided to form a military section, headed by M. S. Kedrov, to combat counterrevolution in the Army. In early 1919, the military control and the military section of VCheKa were merged into one body, the Special Section of the Republic, with Kedrov as head. On January 1, he issued an order to establish the Special Section. The order instructed agencies everywhere to unite the Military control and the military sections of Chekas and to form special sections of frontlines, armies, military districts, and guberniyas.

In November 1920, the Soviet of Labor and Defense created a Special Section of VCheKa for the security of the state border. On February 6, 1922, after the Ninth All-Russian Soviet Congress, the Cheka was dissolved by VTsIK, "with expressions of gratitude for heroic work." It was replaced by the State Political Administration (GPU), a section of Internal Affairs of the Russian Socialist Federative Soviet Republic (RSFSR). Dzerzhinsky remained as chief of the GPU.

== Operations ==
=== Suppression of political opposition ===
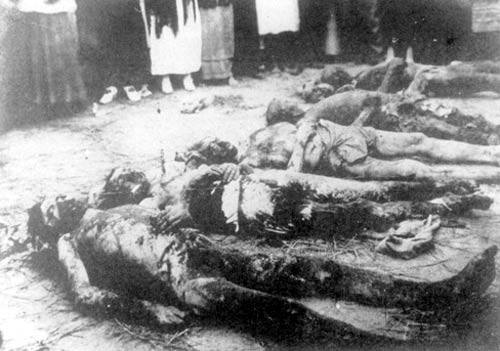
Corpses of hostages executed by Cheka in 1918 in the basement of Tulpanov's house in Kherson, Ukrainian SSR, The Black Book of Communism

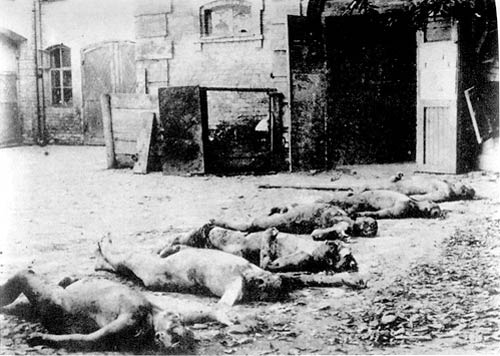
Corpses of people executed by Cheka in 1918 at a yard in Kharkiv, Ukrainian SSR, The Black Book of Communism

As its name implied, the Extraordinary Commission had virtually unlimited powers and could interpret them in any way it wished. No standard procedures were ever set up, except that the commission was supposed to send the arrested to the Military-Revolutionary tribunals if outside of a war zone. This left an opportunity for a wide range of interpretations, as the whole country was in total chaos. At the direction of Lenin, the Cheka performed mass arrests, imprisonments, and executions of "enemies of the people". In this, the Cheka said that they targeted "class enemies" such as the bourgeoisie, and members of the clergy.

Within a month, the Cheka had extended its repression to all political opponents of the communist government, including anarchists and others on the left. On April 11/12, 1918, some 26 anarchist political centres in Moscow were attacked. Forty anarchists were killed by Cheka forces, and about 500 were arrested and jailed after a pitched battle took place between the two groups. In response to the anarchists' resistance, the Cheka orchestrated a massive retaliatory campaign of repression, executions, and arrests against all opponents of the Bolshevik government, in what came to be known as "Red Terror". The Red Terror, implemented by Dzerzhinsky on September 5, 1918, was vividly described by the Red Army journal Krasnaya Gazeta:

Without mercy, without sparing, we will kill our enemies in scores of hundreds. Let them be thousands, let them drown themselves in their own blood. For the blood of Lenin and Uritsky … let there be floods of blood of the bourgeoisie – more blood, as much as possible..."

Early Bolshevik Victor Serge described in his book Memoirs of a Revolutionary:

Since the first massacres of Red prisoners by the Whites, the murders of Volodarsky and Uritsky and the attempt against Lenin (in the summer of 1918), the custom of arresting and, often, executing hostages had become generalized and legal. Already the Cheka, which made mass arrests of suspects, was tending to settle their fate independently, under formal control of the Party, but in reality without anybody's knowledge. The Party endeavoured to head it with incorruptible men like the former convict Dzerzhinsky, a sincere idealist, ruthless but chivalrous, with the emaciated profile of an Inquisitor: tall forehead, bony nose, untidy goatee, and an expression of weariness and austerity. But the Party had few men of this stamp and many Chekas. I believe that the formation of the Chekas was one of the gravest and most impermissible errors that the Bolshevik leaders committed in 1918 when plots, blockades, and interventions made them lose their heads. All evidence indicates that revolutionary tribunals, functioning in the light of day and admitting the right of defense, would have attained the same efficiency with far less abuse and depravity. Was it necessary to revert to the procedures of the Inquisition?"

The Cheka was also used against Nestor Makhno's Revolutionary Insurgent Army of Ukraine. After the Insurgent Army had served its purpose in aiding the Red Army to stop the Whites under Denikin, the Soviet communist government decided to eliminate the anarchist forces. In May 1919, two Cheka agents sent to assassinate Makhno were caught and executed.

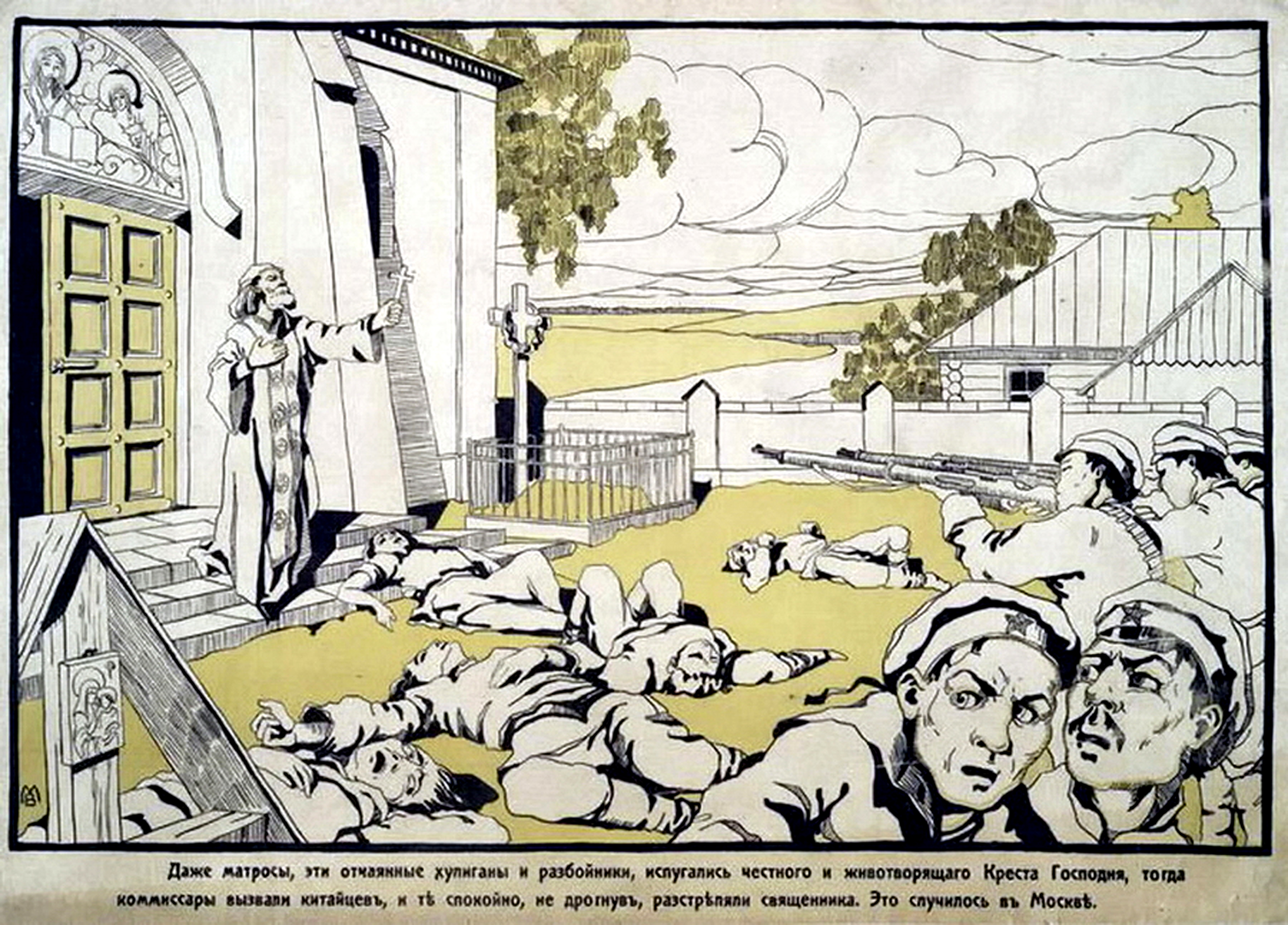
Chinese Chekists executing an Orthodox priest in Moscow, White Russian anti-Bolshevik propaganda poster, c. 1920

Many victims of Cheka repression were "bourgeois hostages" rounded up and held in readiness for summary execution in reprisal for any alleged counter-revolutionary act. Wholesale, indiscriminate arrests became an integral part of the system. The Cheka used trucks disguised as delivery trucks, called "black voronok" or simply voronok (the term translated in English as "Black Maria", for the secret arrest and transport of prisoners.

It was during the Red Terror that the Cheka, hoping to avoid the bloody aftermath of having half-dead victims writhing on the floor, developed a technique for execution known later by the German words "Nackenschuss" or "Genickschuss", a shot to the nape of the neck, which caused minimal blood loss and instant death. The victim's head was bent forward, and the executioner fired slightly downward at point-blank range. This had become the standard method used later by the NKVD to liquidate Joseph Stalin's purge victims and others.

=== Persecution of deserters ===
It is believed that there were more than three million deserters from the Red Army in 1919 and 1920. Officially there was about 2,630,000 registered deserters by the Central Committee for Struggle Against Desertion. Approximately 500,000 deserters were arrested in 1919 and close to 800,000 in 1920, by troops of the 'Special Punitive Department' of the Cheka, created to punish desertions. These troops were used to forcibly repatriate deserters, taking and shooting hostages to force compliance or to set an example.

In September 1918, according to The Black Book of Communism, in only twelve provinces of Russia, 48,735 deserters and 7,325 "bandits" were arrested, 1,826 were killed and 2,230 were executed. The exact identity of these individuals is confused by the fact that the Soviet Bolshevik government used the term 'bandit' to cover ordinary criminals as well as armed and unarmed political opponents, such as the anarchists.

== Repression ==
=== Scholarly estimates ===
There is no consensus among the Western historians on the number of deaths from the Red Terror. One source gives estimates of 28,000 executions per year from December 1917 to February 1922. Estimates for the number of people shot during the initial period of the Red Terror are at least 10,000. Estimates for the whole period go for a low of 50,000 to highs of 140,000 and 200,000 executed. Most estimations for the number of executions in total put the number at about 100,000.

According to Vadim Erlikhman's investigation, the number of the Red Terror's victims is at least 1,200,000 people. According to Robert Conquest, a total of 140,000 people were shot in 1917–1922. Candidate of Historical Sciences Nikolay Zayats states that the number of people shot by the Cheka in 1918–1922 is about 37,300 people, shot in 1918–1921 by the verdicts of the tribunals – 14,200, i.e. about 50,000–55,000 people in total, although executions and atrocities were not limited to the Cheka, having been organized by the Red Army as well.

According to anti-Bolshevik Socialist Revolutionary Sergei Melgunov (1879–1956), at the end of 1919, the Special Investigation Commission to investigate the atrocities of the Bolsheviks estimated the number of deaths at 1,766,188 people in 1918–1919 only.

=== Number of victims ===
Estimates on Cheka executions vary widely. The lowest figures (disputed below) are provided by Dzerzhinsky's lieutenant Martyn Latsis, limited to RSFSR over the period 1918–1920:

- For the period 1918 – July 1919, covering only twenty provinces of central Russia:
  In 1918: 6,300; in 1919 (up to July): 2,089; Total: 8,389
- For the whole period 1918–19:
  In 1918: 6,185; in 1919: 3,456; Total: 9,641
- For the whole period 1918–20:
  In January–June 1918: 22; in July–December 1918: more than 6,000; in 1918–20: 12,733.

Experts generally agree these semi-official figures are vastly understated. Pioneering historian of the Red Terror Sergei Melgunov claims that this was done deliberately in an attempt to demonstrate the government's humanity. For example, he refutes the claim made by Latsis that only 22 executions were carried out in the first six months of the Cheka's existence by providing evidence that the true number was 884 executions. W. H. Chamberlin claims, "It is simply impossible to believe that the Cheka only put to death 12,733 people in all of Russia up to the end of the civil war." Donald Rayfield concurs, noting that, "Plausible evidence reveals that the actual numbers … vastly exceeded the official figures." Chamberlin provides the "reasonable and probably moderate" estimate of 50,000, while others provide estimates ranging up to 500,000. Several scholars put the number of executions at about 250,000. Some believe it is possible more people were murdered by the Cheka than died in battle. Historian James Ryan gives a modest estimate of 28,000 executions per year from December 1917 to February 1922.

Lenin himself seemed unfazed by the killings. On 12 January 1920, while addressing trade union leaders, he said: "We did not hesitate to shoot thousands of people, and we shall not hesitate, and we shall save the country." On 14 May 1921, the Politburo, chaired by Lenin, passed a motion "broadening the rights of the [Cheka] in relation to the use of the [death penalty]."

== Atrocities ==
The Cheka engaged in the widespread practice of torture. Depending on Cheka committees in various cities, the methods included: being skinned alive, scalped, "crowned" with barbed wire, impaled, crucified, hanged, stoned to death, tied to planks and pushed slowly into furnaces or tanks of boiling water, or rolled around naked in internally nail-studded barrels. Chekists reportedly poured water on naked prisoners in the winter-bound streets until they became living ice statues. Others beheaded their victims by twisting their necks until their heads could be torn off. The Cheka detachments stationed in Kiev would attach an iron tube to the torso of a bound victim and insert a rat in the tube closed off with wire netting, while the tube was held over a flame until the rat began gnawing through the victim's guts in an effort to escape.

Women and children were also victims of Cheka terror. Rape of women by Cheka guards and interrogators was commonplace, superiors would only put a stop to it if the rape became too brutal. Many of the women were shot after they were raped. Children between the ages of 8 and 16 were imprisoned and occasionally executed.

All of these atrocities were published on numerous occasions in Pravda and Izvestiya: January 26, 1919 Izvestiya #18 article Is it really a medieval imprisonment? («Неужели средневековый застенок?»); February 22, 1919 Pravda #12 publishes details of the Vladimir Cheka's tortures, September 21, 1922 Socialist Herald publishes details of series of tortures conducted by the Stavropol Cheka (hot basement, cold basement, skull measuring, etc.).

The Chekists were also supplemented by the militarized Units of Special Purpose (the Party's Spetsnaz or ЧОН).

Cheka was actively and openly utilizing kidnapping methods. With kidnapping methods, Cheka was able to extinguish numerous cases of discontent especially among the rural population. Among the notorious ones was the Tambov rebellion.

Villages were bombarded to complete annihilation, as in the case of Tretyaki, Novokhopersk uyezd, Voronezh Governorate. As a result of this relentless violence, more than a few Chekists ended up with psychopathic disorders, which Nikolai Bukharin said were "an occupational hazard of the Chekist profession." Many hardened themselves to the executions by heavy drinking and drug use. Some developed a gangster-like slang for the verb to kill in an attempt to distance themselves from the killings, such as 'shooting partridges', or 'sealing' a victim, or giving him a natsokal (onomatopoeia of the trigger action).On November 30, 1992, by the initiative of the President of the Russian Federation the Constitutional Court of the Russian Federation recognized the Red Terror as unlawful, which in turn led to the suspension of Communist Party of the RSFSR.

== Regional Chekas ==
Cheka departments were organized not only in big cities and guberniya seats, but also in each uyezd, at any front-lines and military formations. Nothing is known on what resources they were created.

Moscow Cheka (1918–1922)

- Chairman – Felix Dzerzhinsky (also the leader of the Cheka overall)
- Deputy – Yakov Peters (initially the chairman of the Petrograd Department for a month, and the number two in the Cheka overall)
- Other members – Shklovsky, Kneyfis, Tseystin, Razmirovich, Kronberg, Khaikina, Karlson, Shauman, Lentovich, Rivkin, Antonov, Delafabr, Tsytkin, G. Sverdlov, Bizensky, Yakov Blumkin, Aleksandrovich, Fines, Zaks, Yakov Goldin, Galpershtein, Kniggisen, Martin Latsis (later transfer (chief of jail), Fogel, Zakis, Shillenkus, Yanson).

Petrograd Cheka (1918–1922)

- Chairman – Moisei Uritsky (January 1918 to 30 August 1918), Gleb Bokii (31 August 1918 to 30 September 1918), Meinkman (October 1918 to January 1919), Varvara Yakovleva (acting chair in two periods; November 1918 to January 1919; and October 1919 to October 1921), Nikolai Antipov (January 1919 to October 1919)
- Deputy – Gleb Bokii (March 1918 to August 1918), Varvara Yakovleva (September 1918 to February 1922), Nikolai Antipov (acting deputy chairman from November 1918 to January 1919)
- Other members – Reiller, Kozlovsky, Model, Rozmirovich, I. Diesporov, Iselevich, Krassikov, Bukhan, Merbis, Paykis, Anvelt.

Kharkov Cheka

- Deych, Vikhman, Timofey, Vera (Dora) Grebenshchikova, A. G. Aleksandra
- Ashykin.

== Popular culture ==
- The Cheka were popular staples in Soviet film and literature. This was partly due to a romanticization of the organisation in the post-Stalin period, and also because they provided a useful action/detection template. Films featuring the Cheka include Ostern's Miles of Fire, Nikita Mikhalkov's At Home among Strangers, the miniseries The Adjutant of His Excellency, and also Dead Season (starring Donatas Banionis), and the 1992 Russian drama film The Chekist.
- In Spain, during the Spanish Civil War, the detention and torture centers operated by the Republicans were named "checas" after the Soviet organization. Alfonso Laurencic was their promoter, ideologist and builder.
- Dzerzhinsky, who rarely drank, is said to have told Lenin – on an occasion in which he did so excessively – that secret police work could be done by "only saints or scoundrels ... but now the saints are running away from me and I am left with the scoundrels".
- The Chekist, directed by Aleksandr Rogozhkin, is a 1992 French–Russian film based on a 1923 short story by Vladimir Zazubrin. It tells the story of a bloody work and downfall of a Soviet Cheka security official involved in mass executions during the Russian Civil War.
- The Soviet Story, a 2008 Latvian film, mentioned that Cheka is the Soviet terror machine, and Cheka is the "teacher" of Nazi gestapo.

== Legacy ==
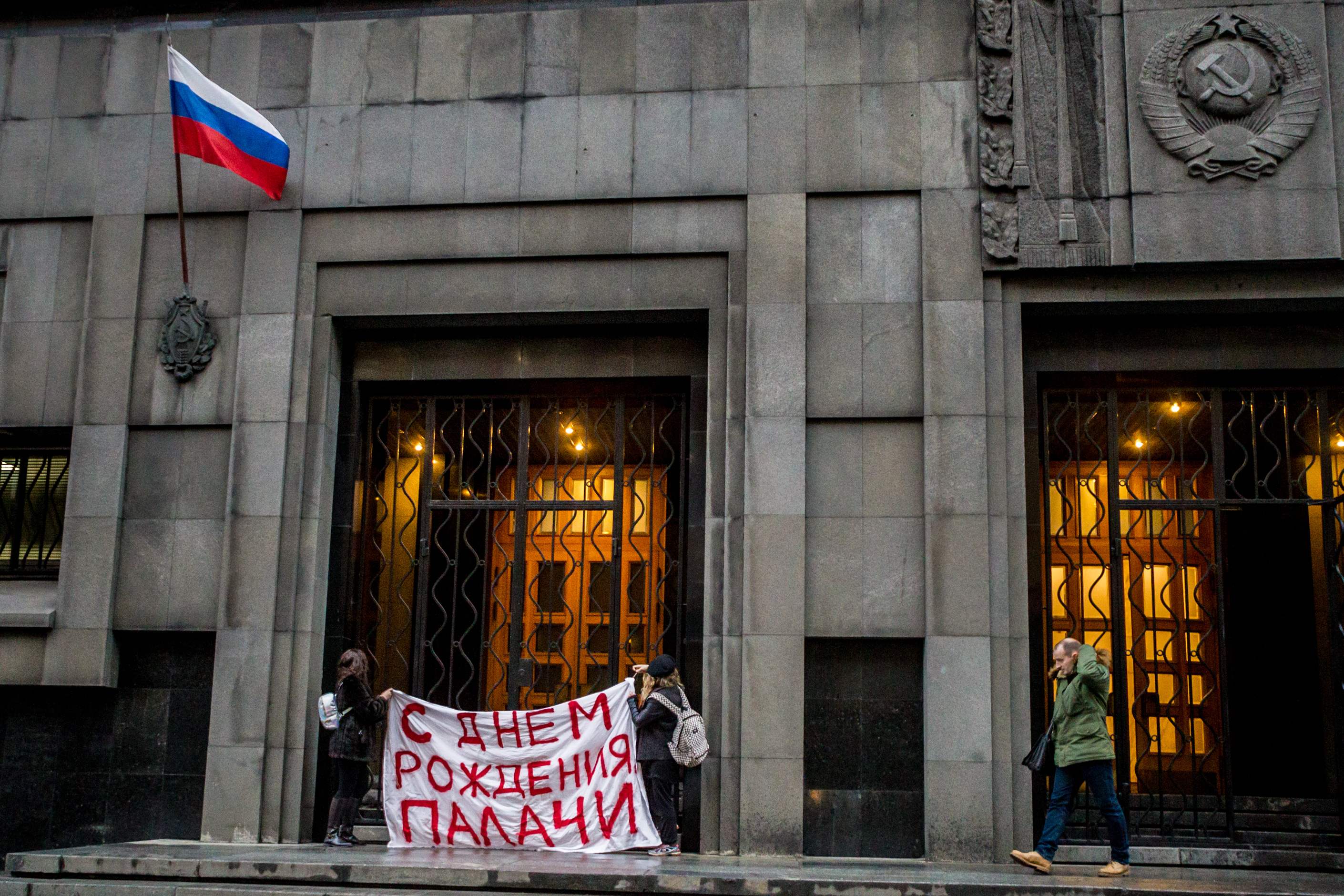
"Happy Birthday, Executioners" near the main FSB building, on the day the centenary of the Cheka was celebrated, 20 December 2017

Konstantin Preobrazhenskiy criticised the continuing celebration of the professional holiday of the old and the modern Russian security services on the anniversary of the creation of the Cheka, The Day of the Security Authorities of the Russian Federation, with the assent of the Presidents of Russia. (Vladimir Putin, former KGB officer, chose not to change the date to another): "The successors of the KGB still haven't renounced anything; they even celebrate their professional holiday the same day, as during repression, on the 20th of December. It is as if the present intelligence and counterespionage services of Germany celebrated Gestapo Day. I can imagine how indignant our press would be!"

== See also ==
- Bibliography of the Russian Revolution and Civil War
- Outline of the Russian Revolution and Civil War
- Index of articles related to the Russian Revolution and Civil War
- Chronology of Soviet secret police agencies
- Okhrana
- Russian Civil War
- Outline of the Red Terror (Russia)

== Sources ==
- Andrew, Christopher M. and Vasili Mitrokhin (1999) The Sword and the Shield : The Mitrokhin Archive and the Secret History of the KGB. New York: Basic Books. ISBN 0-465-00312-5.
- Chamberlin, W. H. (1935) The Russian Revolution 1917–1921, 2 vols. London and New York. The Macmillan Company.
- Dziak, John. (1988) Chekisty: A History of the KGB. Lexington, Massachusetts Lexington Books.
- Figes, Orlando (1997) A People's Tragedy: The Russian Revolution 1891–1924. Penguin Books. ISBN 0-670-85916-8.
- Leggett, George (1986) The Cheka: Lenin's Political Police. Oxford University Press, New York. ISBN 0-19-822862-7
- Lincoln, W. Bruce (1999) Red Victory: A History of the Russian Civil War. Da Capo Press. ISBN 0-306-80909-5
- Lowe, Norman (2002). Mastering Twentieth Century Russian History. Palgrave. ISBN 978-0-333-96307-4.
- Melgounov, Sergey Petrovich (1925) The Red Terror in Russia. London & Toronto: J. M. Dent & Sons Ltd.
- Overy, Richard (2004) The Dictators: Hitler's Germany, Stalin's Russia. W. W. Norton & Company; 1st American edition. ISBN 0-393-02030-4
- Rummel, Rudolph Joseph (1990) Lethal Politics: Soviet Genocide and Mass Murder Since 1917. Transaction Publishers. ISBN 1-56000-887-3
- Ryan, James (2012). Lenin's Terror: The Ideological Origins of Early Soviet State Violence. London: Routledge. ISBN 978-1-138-81568-1.
- Schapiro, Leonard B. (1984) The Russian Revolutions of 1917 : The Origins of Modern Communism. New York: Basic Books. ISBN 0-465-07154-6
- Volkogonov, Dmitri (1994) Lenin: A New Biography. Free Press. ISBN 0-02-933435-7
- Volkogonov, Dmitri (1998) Autopsy of an Empire: The Seven Leaders Who Built the Soviet Regime Free Press. ISBN 0-684-87112-2
