= Chinese in the Russian Revolution and in the Russian Civil War =

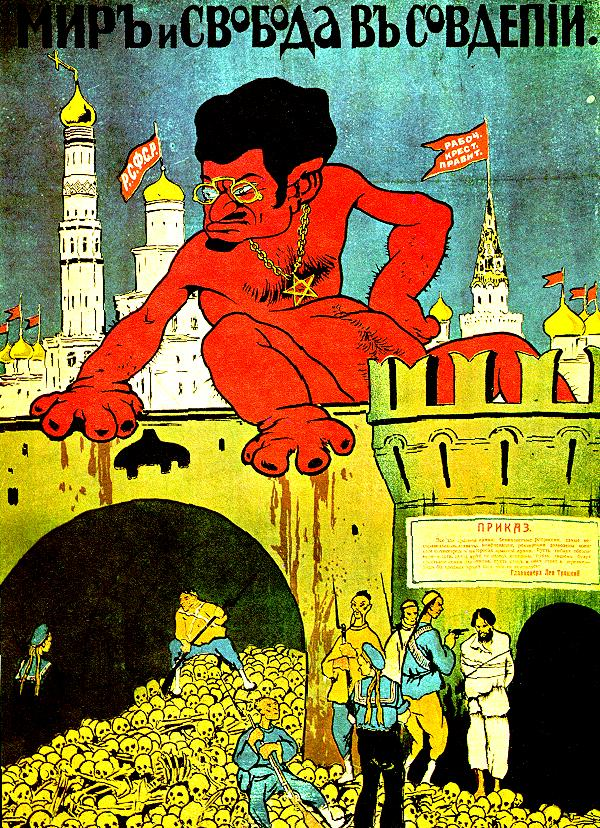
1919 White Army propaganda poster. Chinese soldiers wearing queues and blue-gold uniforms are depicted executing a prisoner and shoveling bones as a demonic Leon Trotsky looms above.

There are a number of reports about the involvement of Chinese detachments in the Russian Revolution and Russian Civil War. Chinese troops served as bodyguards of Bolshevik functionaries, served in the Cheka, and even formed complete regiments of the Red Army. It has been estimated that there were tens of thousands of Chinese troops in the Red Army, and they were among the few groups of foreigners fighting for the Red Army.

Other notable examples of foreigners serving in the Red Army include Koreans in the Russian Far East, Czech and Slovak nationals, Hungarian communists under Béla Kun, Red Latvian Riflemen as well as a number of other national detachments. By the summer of 1919, the Red Army comprised over a million men. By November 1920, it comprised over 1.8 million men. Foreign soldiers did not make up a significant bulk of the Red Army, and the majority of the soldiers of the Red Army fighting in the Russian Revolution and Russian Civil War were Russians.

== Background: Chinese speakers in Russia ==
Large numbers of Chinese lived and worked in Siberia in the late Russian Empire. Many of these migrant workers were transferred to the European part of Russia and to the Ural during World War I because of the acute shortage of workers there. For example, by 1916 there were about 5,000 Chinese workers in Novgorod Governorate. In 1916-1917 about 2,000 Chinese workers were employed in the construction of Russian fortifications around the Gulf of Finland. A significant number of them were convicted robbers (honghuzi, "Red Beards", transliterated into Russian as "khunkhuzy", хунхузы) transferred from katorga labor camps in Harbin and other locations in the Far Eastern regions of the Russian Empire. After the Russian Revolution, some of them stayed in Finland and took part as volunteers in the Finnish Civil War on the allied communist side. After 1917 many of these Chinese workers joined the Red Army. The vast majority of these Chinese were apolitical and become soldiers solely in order to gain rights as workers in a foreign country.

== Dungans in the 1916 Revolt ==
Dungans fought alongside Kyrgyz rebels in attacking Przheval'sk during the 1916 Basmachi revolt.

A Dungan Muslim and communist Commander Magaza Masanchi of the Dungan Cavalry Regiment fought for the Soviet Union against the Basmachis. He also took part in other actions in central Asia.

== Chinese detachments in service of Soviet state ==
=== Chinese in the Red Army ===
All of the capitals of the major Soviet republics in the European sphere of the soon-to-be USSR (established 1922) and Petrograd/St. Petersburg had sizable contingents of "others" as Red Guards. "Others" refers to Buryats, Armenians, Cossacks, Tatars, Latvians, Hungarians, Poles, Jews and to some degree Chinese. Of note is the fact that after the October Revolution, Red Guards were organized in state commercial enterprises, factories and plants often at the request of the local or regional workers' Soviet (autonomous workers' council in the plant, factory, etc.). In the Paramonovskii settlement in the Donbas, there were 27 Chinese and 3 Austrian Red Guards. In the Almazno settlement, there were Chinese, Germans, Czechs, Slovaks and Poles in addition to Russians, Ukrainians and Cossacks. Minsk supposedly had many Chinese Red Guards (but it is believed that "one thousand" the estimate given by Benton is too high). In the Russian Far East, from a total of 330 Red Guards in the city of Nikolsk-Ussuriisk, 57 were Koreans in May 1918. The main duties of the Cheka were to fight against counter-revolution, sabotage and quell internal dissent. They were allowed to use "extra-legal" means to search, arrest, destroy and torture. In the beginning, there were three main sections which quickly grew into four or more. The first three sections were: information section (information collection and administration), organizational section (executive to determine who and how to fight against the "enemies" of the new state) and the fighting section. Later, the administrative section grew as the Cheka grew to approximately 100,000 by 1920. There are some who argue that the Cheka had grown to over 200,000 by 1920. The Cheka grew from 23 men in the beginning to approximately 100,000 plus by 1919-1920 (a conservative estimate). They took their ranks from the pre-existing Bolshevik group, the MRC (the Military Revolutionary Committee), the Red Guards (the predecessor to the Soviet police (militsia), the pre-Revolution, Russian Army, mercenaries and recruits.

The Chinese with the Red Army were recruited from factory workers who had been attracted into Russia before the war and sided with the urban proletariat with whom they worked. Separate Chinese units fought for the Bolsheviks in Ukraine, Transcaucasia and Siberia.

One estimate suggests that there were hundreds of thousands of Chinese troops in the Red Army. Nonetheless, Brian Murphy asserts that "the number of Chinese troops did not constitute a significant fraction of the Red Army." By summer of 1919, the Red Army comprised over a million men. By November 1920, it comprised over 1.8 million men.

Chinese units were involved in virtually every front of the Russian Civil War. Some sincerely sympathized with the Bolsheviks who treated them as "proletarian brothers". Others simply joined the Red Army in order to survive and others wanted to fight their way home to China.

The Chinese were one of several foreign contingents dubbed in Soviet historiography as "internationalist detachments" ("отряды интернационалистов"). Chinese internationalist troops wore the same uniform as the rest of the Red Army.

The Chinese Cheka and Chekists typically served in four special category units of the Cheka: CHON (special purpose para military units), VNUS (internal service troops), VOKhR (internal service troops) and the Cheka OOs (Frontier Cheka). VNUS and VOKhR troops served as an internal security force on the military front in times of war. Sometimes, they served as police in rear guard, military areas (policing soldiers). When necessary they fought along Red Army troops. CHON were mainly used to protect key military, political or state buildings, bases and installations, assisting Cheka operations, quelling uprisings and giving combat support to the Red Army. After 1921, several East Asian Cheka formed the Frontier Cheka, Border Guards and or Cheka OOs (standing for Frontier Cheka). The Bolsheviks found special value in the use of Chinese troops who were considered to be industrious and efficient. In addition, they were seldom able to understand Russian, which kept them insulated from outside influences.

The use of Chinese troops by the Bolsheviks was commented on by both White Russian and non-Russian observers. In fact, the Bolsheviks were often derided for their reliance on Chinese and Latvian volunteers. Anti-Bolshevik propaganda suggested that the Bolsheviks did not have the support of the Russian people and thus had to resort to foreign mercenaries who ran roughshod over the Russian populace.

In 1918, Dmitri Gavronsky, a member of the Russian Constituent Assembly, asserted that the Bolsheviks based their power chiefly on foreign support. He asserted that, "in Moscow, they have at their disposal 16,000 well-armed Lettish soldiers, some detachments of Finnish Red Guards and a large battalion of Chinese troops." Gavronsky added that "The latter are always used for executions."

In his book Between Red and White, Leon Trotsky makes sarcastic reference to the charge that the Soviets held Petrograd and Moscow "by the aid of 'Lettish, Chinese, German and Bashkir regiments'".

The Red Army commander Iona Yakir headed a Chinese detachment guarding Lenin and Trotsky. Later he headed a regiment made up of volunteer Chinese workers, which achieved distinction in battle when the Red Army heavily defeated (temporarily) Romanian troops in February 1918 during the Romanian occupation of Bessarabia.

There was also a Chinese detachment in the "Konarmiya" 1st Cavalry Army of Semyon Budyonny.

=== Chinese in the Cheka and military guard units ===
Some Chinese volunteers, who had fanatical devotion to the revolution, were allowed to join the Cheka and various military guard detachments. In 1919, there were some 700 Chinese troops in the Cheka. The Cheka utilized them for the arrest and execution of anti-Soviet soldiers.

== Chinese participation in the Allied intervention ==
The Beiyang government in north China joined the Allied intervention in the Russian Civil War. They sent forces numbering 2,300 in Siberia and North Russia beginning in 1918, after the Chinese community in the area requested aid. Many of these soldiers later defected to the Red Army.

== 1930s ==
Despite many Chinese serving in the Red Army, the Soviet Chinese were repressed and arrested starting in 1928. By 1938, few Chinese remained in European Russia or the Russian Far East.

== Notable persons ==
Ren Fuchen (任辅臣) (1884–1918) from Tieling was the first Bolshevik in North Liaoning and a commander of the Chinese regiment of the Soviet Red Army. He is commemorated as a revolutionary hero in the People's Republic of China.

== In literature ==
There is a 1923 short story, Chinese Story by Mikhail Bulgakov, about a Chinese mercenary in the Red Army.

The 1929 comic book by Hergé, "Tintin au pays des soviets" includes a scene where Tintin is put in a cell to be tortured by Chinese Cheka/NKVD professionals.

The 1936 historical novel Names in Marble by the Estonian author Albert Kivikas describes the fate of some captured Chinese soldiers whose units were part of the invading Russian army, in the hands of the Estonian patriots during the Estonian War of Independence.

== See also ==
- List of states and regions involved in the Russian Civil War
- Bibliography of the Russian Revolution and Civil War
- Outline of the Russian Revolution and Civil War
- International Brigades - detachments of foreigners who fought for the Republicans during Spanish Civil War
- Chinese-Lenin School of Vladivostok (1924–1938)
