= Park of Builders (Rostov-on-Don) =

- Парк строителей (Russian)
- Interactive map of Park of Builders
- 47.1346°N 39.4205°E
- Type: Park of Culture and Rest
- Location: Rostov-on-Don, Russia

History
- Built: 1903

The Park of Builders (Russian: Парк строителей) also the Park of Culture of Builders is one of the parks of Rostov-on-Don, which was laid at the beginning of the 20th century on the place of the philistine farmstead. The park is located in the Oktyabrsky district of the city.

== History ==
Earlier the Novoposelensky garden was in the place of the park of Builders. It was founded in 1903 during the construction of the building of the People's Theater. Earlier in this place was the estate of the petty bourgeois Garbuz and near the estate was Garbuz Garden, named after the owner of the estate. On the territory of the garden were planted whole sites with fruit trees. It was possible to get to Novopoliselensky garden from several sides because there were several entrances. The first entrance was from Budyonnovsky Prospekt, and it was considered the main entrance. The second was located from Pochtovy Lane opposite to 5th Street.

As of 1909 the Novoposelensky garden was one of two existing gardens of Rostov-on-Don for city use - the second object of such a plan was called the City Garden. The territory of both gardens was occupied by plantings of trees, the total area of which occupied 13 acres of land. On the preserved plan of the city according to the edition of 1911, the territory of green plantations carried the name of Novoposelensky garden.

The territory of the Novoposelensky Garden in Rostov-on-Don was located between the Pochtovy Lane and Taganrog Avenue passed along Sixth Street- The documents preserved the mention of the garden created before 1917.

Then Novoposelensky garden was renamed and began to be called the park of V. Mayakovsky. It happened during the 1940s - 1950s. The District House of Officers of the North Caucasus Military District became its owner.

In the 1960s the military left this place for a decade no one was engaged in the improvement of the park everything fell into decay. Under the mayor of the city G. Ye. Konovalov the fences around the park were broken. The park began to visit the citizens, as a result of which many flower beds and lawns were trampled, and benches and other objects were broken. The park was renamed the Park of Cultures of Builders and was inaugurated on November 7, 1976.

In 1987 a monument to the victims of Stalin's repressions appeared on the northern part of the park.

At the end of XX - at the beginning of the XXI century the park is in unsatisfactory condition. From the old paths, beds and layout in general, little is left. The decorative shrub and many other plantings and objects were destroyed.

== Literature ==
- Kuprik, Irina Sergeevna (2015). "Экологический мониторинг парка Строителей (г. Ростов-на-Дону)" [Ecological monitoring of the Park of builders (Rostov-on-Don)]. Science Time (in Russian). 16 (4): 412–415.
- Potashev, Fedor Ivanovich (2006). Град Ростов [City Rostov] (in Russian). Rostov-on-Don: NB. ISBN 9785981550171.
- Sidorov, Vladimir Sergeevich (1994). Энциклопедия старого Ростова и Нахичевани-на-Дону [Encyclopedia of old Rostov and Nakhichevan-on-Don] (in Russian). Rostov-on-Don: Rostov-on-Don public library.
