= Ren Fuchen =

- Born: April 1884; Tieling County, Liaoning Province, Qing China
- Died: November 1918 (aged 34) Sverdlovsk Oblast, RSFSR
- Branch: Red Army
- Conflicts: Russian Civil War

Ren Fuchen (Chinese: 任辅臣; April 1884 – November 1918) was a Chinese member of the Bolshevik party and a commander of a Chinese regiment of the Soviet Red Army during the Russian Civil War. He joined the Bolsheviks in 1908. He was killed in action during a battle against the White Army forces of Alexander Kolchak. He was known as "China's first Bolshevik". In the aftermath of the Russian Revolution, he raised a regiment of 1,500 Chinese expatriates for the Soviet cause. He was killed in November 1918. The Soviet Union awarded him a Red Flag medal in November 1989, and a statue of him was erected in Tieling, his hometown, in 1993.
