= Sergei Melgunov =

Russian historian and politician (1879 - 1956)

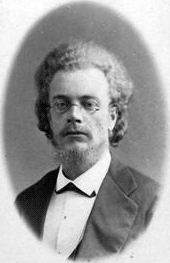
Portrait of Melgunov, circa 1899.

Sergei Petrovich Melgunov (Russian: Серге́й Петро́вич Мельгуно́в; December 24 or 25, 1879 – May 26, 1956) was a Russian historian, publicist and politician best known for his opposition to the Soviet government and his numerous works on the Russian Revolution of 1917 and the Russian Civil War.

Melgunov was born in Moscow to an old aristocratic family. His mother was Polish, née Gruszecka. Having graduated from Moscow University in 1904, he began his political and scholarly career in Imperial Russia. He became a member of the Russian Constitutional Democratic party ("Cadets") in 1906 and joined the People's Socialist Party in 1907. In 1911, Melgunov established a publishing house Zadruga ("Задруга"), where he published over 500 books, and a journal Golos minuvshego ("The Voice of the Past"). After the 1917 Bolshevik October Revolution, he became an active opponent of Lenin's government and joined the anti-Soviet Union of Revival of Russia, which advocated an armed overthrow of the Bolshevik regime.

He was arrested and sentenced to death in 1919, then reprieved, with the sentence commuted to imprisonment. He was released in 1921 and forced into exile in 1922. First living in Germany, Melgunov finally settled in Paris, where he continued his historical research and edited several émigré journals. His most famous book is Red Terror in Russia (Russian: Красный террор в России), detailing the chronology of Bolshevik repression and atrocities. It was first published in 1924. Historian Robert Gellately describes Melgunov's pioneering study of the Red Terror as "a detailed and shocking account" which "has been confirmed by recent revelations from the Russian archives and by historians."

== Bibliography ==
- Petrovich Melgunov, Serge (1975). Красный террор в России [Red Terror in Russia]. Hyperion Pr. ISBN 0-88355-187-X.
