= Voronok =

Voronok Воронок
- Selo
- Location within Bryansk Oblast Location within Russia
- Coordinates: 52°21′N 32°39′E
- Country: Russia
- Region: Bryansk Oblast
- District: Starodubsky District
- Time zone: UTC+3:00

Voronok (Russian: Воронок) is a rural locality (a selo) and the administrative center of Voronokskoye Rural Settlement, Starodubsky District, Bryansk Oblast, Russia. The population was 1,139 as of 2010. There are 13 streets.

== Geography ==
Voronok is located 29 km south of Starodub (the district's administrative centre) by road. Strativa is the nearest rural locality.
