= Political repression in the Soviet Union =

Throughout the history of the Soviet Union, tens of millions of people suffered political repression, which was an instrument of the state since the October Revolution. It culminated during the Stalin era, then declined, but it continued to exist during the "Khrushchev Thaw", followed by increased persecution of Soviet dissidents during the Brezhnev era, and it did not cease to exist until late in Mikhail Gorbachev's rule when it was ended in keeping with his policies of glasnost and perestroika.

== Background ==
Secret police had a long history in Tsarist Russia. Ivan the Terrible used the Oprichina, while more recently the Third Section and Okhrana existed.

The Russian Revolution of 1917 started with the February Revolution. The tsar was forced to abdicate, and the monarchist government was replaced with the Russian Provisional Government, which was led by liberals and socialists. This government implemented freedom of expression and the press. There were preparations for the elections for the Russian Constituent Assembly in November 1917. The industrial workers and peasants started to organise in soviets and factory committees. In these organisations there were Mensheviks, Social Revolutionaries, Bolsheviks, anarchists and people without ideology. From July 1917, the Provisional Government was mainly led by the Social Revolutionaries and Mensheviks. The Bolshevik communists declined to be part of the Provisional Government. The Provisional Government was violently replaced by the communist government of Vladimir Lenin during the October Revolution.

== Origins and early Soviet times ==
Early on, the Leninist view of the class conflict and the resulting notion of the dictatorship of the proletariat provided the theoretical basis of the repressions. Its legal basis was formalized into the Article 58 in the code of the Russian SFSR and similar articles for other Soviet republics.

According to the Marxist historian Marcel Liebman, Lenin's wartime measures such as banning opposition parties was prompted by the fact that several political parties either took up arms against the new Soviet government, or participated in sabotage, collaborated with the deposed Tsarists, or made assassination attempts against Lenin and other Bolshevik leaders. Liebman noted that opposition parties such as the Cadets who were democratically elected to the Soviets in some areas, then proceeded to use their mandate to welcome in Tsarist and foreign capitalist military forces. In one incident in Baku, the British military, once invited in, proceeded to execute members of the Bolshevik Party who had peacefully stood down from the Soviet when they failed to win the elections. As a result, the Bolsheviks banned each opposition party when it turned against the Soviet government. In some cases, bans were lifted. This banning of parties did not have the same repressive character as later bans enforced under the Stalinist regime. Trotsky also argued that he and Lenin had intended to lift the ban on the opposition parties such as the Mensheviks and Socialist Revolutionaries as soon as the economic and social conditions of Soviet Russia had improved.

In contradiction of the interpretation of Marxists like Liebman and others, Bolshevik leaders Lenin, Trotsky and Zinoviev made statements about deliberately working for the creation of a power monopoly for their party.

At times, the repressed were called the enemies of the people. Punishments by the state included summary executions, sending innocent people to Gulag, forced resettlement, and stripping of citizen's rights. Repression was conducted by the Cheka secret police and its successors, and other state organs. Periods of increased repression include the Red Terror, Collectivization, the Great Purges, the Doctors' Plot, and others. The secret police forces conducted massacres of prisoners on numerous occasions. Repression took place in the Soviet republics and in the territories occupied by the Soviet Army during and following World War II, including the Baltic states and Eastern Europe.

The Provisional Government had planned the election of the Constituent Assembly in November 1917. The Sovnarkom decided – against the opinion of Lenin – to let the elections go as planned. The list of the Social Revolutionaries received 16 million votes (38 percent). The Bolsheviks received 24 percent of the votes, receiving 9 million votes. The opening of the Constituent Assembly was postponed several times by the communist government. Three members of the voting commission were arrested by the Bolsheviks. The liberal party (Constitutional Democratic Party) was declared illegal. Several members of the liberal party were arrested, including people who had been elected to the assembly. Also, the leaders of the Social Revolutionaries, Mensheviks and members of the Peasants Soviet were arrested by the communists. On January 18 of 1918, the Constituent Assembly was opened. Approximately 50,000 people were protesting in favour of the Constituent Assembly. More than ten people were killed by communist troops. It was the first time since the February Revolution that government troops were shooting at unarmed protesters. On the same day, the first meeting of the Constituent Assembly was opened. The most important bill of the Bolsheviks was rejected. The main component of the proposal was that the Constituent Assembly would forfeit its legislative power. The following day the representatives found the entrances of the parliament building closed, which meant the end of the Constituent Assembly.

The Mensheviks and members of the Social Revolutionary Party participated in the elections of the soviets as independent candidates, because those parties were forbidden. The Mensheviks and Social Revolutionaries won many elections during the spring and summer of 1918 in Tula, Yaroslavl, Kostroma, Briansk and other cities. The most soviets in which they won were violently abolished by the Bolsheviks.

State repression led to incidents of popular resistance, such as the Tambov peasant rebellion (1920–1921), the Kronstadt rebellion (1921), and the Vorkuta Uprising (1953); the Soviet authorities suppressed such resistance with overwhelming military force and brutality. During the Tambov rebellion, Mikhail Tukhachevsky (chief Red Army commander in the area) authorized Bolshevik military forces to use chemical weapons against villages with civilian population and rebels. Publications in local Communist newspapers openly glorified liquidations of "bandits" with the poison gas. The Internal Troops of the Cheka and the Red Army practiced the terror tactics of taking and executing numerous hostages, often in connection with desertions of forcefully mobilized peasants. According to Orlando Figes, more than 1 million people deserted from the Red Army in 1918, around 2 million people deserted in 1919, and almost 4 million deserters escaped from the Red Army in 1921.

In 1919, 612 "hardcore" deserters of the total 837,000 draft dodgers and deserters were executed following Trotsky's dracionan measures. According to Figes, "a majority of deserters (most registered as "weak-willed") were handed back to the military authorities, and formed into units for transfer to one of the rear armies or directly to the front". Even those registered as "malicious" deserters were returned to the ranks when the demand for reinforcements became desperate". Forges also noted that the Red Army instituted amnesty weeks to prohibit punitive measures against desertion which encouraged the voluntary return of 98,000-132,000 deserters to the army.

For a long time historians assumed that the destruction of the officer cadre of the Red Army happened during Stalin's Great Purge. However new data that emerged on the break of the 21st century radically changed this perception, and the information was uncovered about the so-called Vesna Case, a massive series of Soviet repressions targeting former officers and generals of the Russian Imperial Army who had served in the Red Army and Soviet Navy, a major purge of the Red Army during 1930-1931.

== Red Terror ==
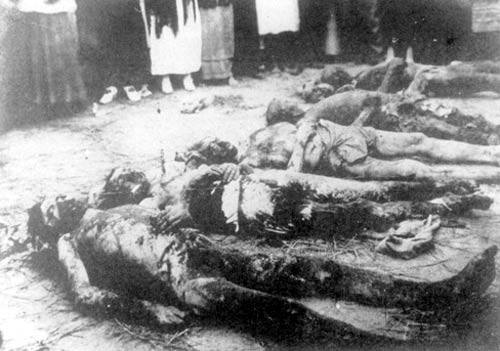
Corpses of hostages executed by Cheka in 1918 in the basement of Tulpanov's house in Kherson, Ukrainian SSR, The Black Book of Communism

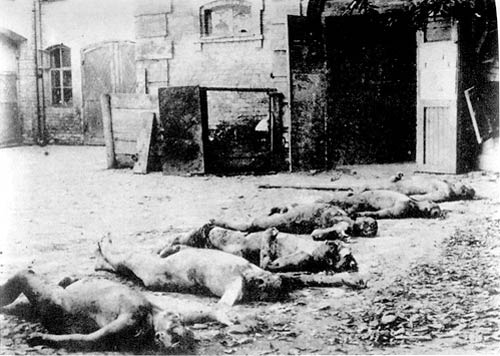
Corpses of people executed by Cheka in 1918 at a yard in Kharkiv, Ukrainian SSR, The Black Book of Communism

In his book, Terrorism and Communism: A Reply to Karl Kautsky, Trotsky also argued that the reign of terror began with the White Terror under the White Guard forces and the Bolsheviks responded with the Red Terror. There is no consensus among the Western historians on the number of deaths from the Red Terror in Soviet Russia. One source gives estimates of 28,000 executions per year from December 1917 to February 1922. Estimates for the number of people shot during the initial period of the Red Terror are at least 10,000. Estimates for the whole period go for a low of 50,000 to highs of 140,000 and 200,000 executed. Most estimations for the number of executions in total put the number at about 100,000. However, social scientist Nikolay Zayats from the National Academy of Sciences of Belarus has argued that the figures have been greatly exaggerated due to White Army propaganda.

The communist government declared all grain surpluses of the farmers officially as state property. After that, the grain surpluses were confiscated (Prodrazverstka). A large group of peasants did not want to deliver their grain to the communist government, because they needed the grain surpluses for their own food or as seed for the next year, or they wanted to sell it for a higher price. Violence by the communists against the peasants were carried out during the expropriation of horses, the confiscating of food and forced conscription. This led to uprisings of the peasants. The communists sent armed forces against the villages. Hostages were taken, hundreds of people were shot and several villages were burned down by the communists. The confiscations by the communists were the cause of the Tambov Uprising, which started in the autumn of 1920. The communists used poison gas against the peasants. Concentration camps were established. Whole villages were put into the camps, shot or deported to the arctic circle. Around 15,000 people were shot after being arrested without any form of judicial process. The total death toll of the Tambov Uprising is estimated at 240,000.

The Bolsheviks introduced the De-Cossackization campaign against the Cossacks. In 1919 and 1920, between 300,000 and 500,000 Cossacks were killed or deported. In June 1919, Lenin remarked to party members that there were excesses in the fight against the Cossacks, but that these were caused by the immature enthusiasm of local party cadres. In reality, the Orgburo of the Communist Party already knew about the murders, without taking action against it.

According to Vadim Erlikhman's investigation, the number of the Red Terror's victims is at least 1,200,000 people. According to Robert Conquest, a total of 140,000 people were shot in 1917–1922. Candidate of Historical Sciences Nikolay Zayats states that the number of people shot by the Cheka in 1918–1922 is about 37,300 people, shot in 1918–1921 by the verdicts of the tribunals—14,200, i.e. about 50,000–55,000 people in total, although executions and atrocities were not limited to the Cheka, having been organized by the Red Army as well.

In 1924, anti-Bolshevik Popular Socialist Sergei Melgunov (1879–1956) published a detailed account on the Red Terror in Russia, where he cited Professor Charles Saroléa's estimates of 1,766,188 deaths from the Bolshevik policies. He questioned the accuracy of the figures, but endorsed Saroléa's "characterisation of terror in Russia", stating it matches reality. Modern historian Sergei Volkov, assessing the Red Terror as the entire repressive policy of the Bolsheviks during the years of the Civil War (1917–1922), estimates the direct death toll of the Red Terror at 2 million people. Volkov's calculations, however, do not appear to have been confirmed by other major scholars. (Note: In particular, they seem quite at odds with the demographic considerations elaborated by Italian historian and professor Andrea Graziosi in the light of the good quality Tsarist and early Soviet statistics. According to him, the excess deaths between 1914 and 1922 were about 16 million, of which 4–5 were military, the rest civilian. The overwhelming majority of the latter resulted from "starvation, typhus, epidemics, the Spanish flu and the famine of 1921-22", the roughly number of "victims of the various kinds of terror, and red and white repressions" amounting to a few hundred thousand— albeit a dreadful number in itself.)

== Collectivization ==
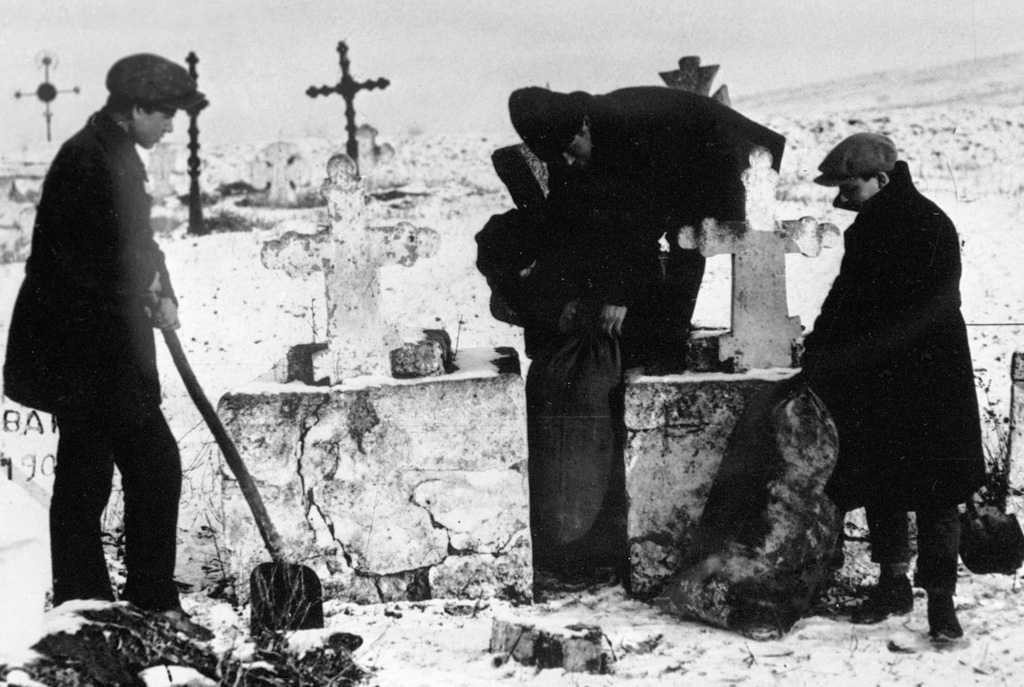
The contemporary caption says "YCLers seizing grain from kulaks which was hidden in the graveyard, Ukraine, 1930." At the height of collectivization anyone resisting it was declared a "kulak"

Collectivization in the Soviet Union was a policy, pursued between 1928 and 1933, to consolidate individual land and labour into collective farms (Russian: колхо́з, kolkhoz, plural kolkhozy). The Soviet leaders were confident that the replacement of individual peasant farms by kolkhozy would immediately increase food supplies for the urban population, the supply of raw materials for processing industry, and agricultural exports generally. Collectivization was thus regarded as the solution to the crisis in agricultural distribution (mainly in grain deliveries) that had developed since 1927 and was becoming more acute as the Soviet Union pressed ahead with its ambitious industrialization program. As the peasantry, with the exception of the poorest part, resisted the collectivization policy, the Soviet government resorted to harsh measures to force the farmers to collectivize. In his conversation with Winston Churchill, Joseph Stalin gave his estimate of the number of "kulaks" who were repressed for resisting Soviet collectivization as 10 million, including those forcibly deported.

The death toll of the famine was very high in Ukraine and Kazakhstan. The famine in Ukraine (Holodomor) was mainly caused by the policy of the Soviet government. The estimated death toll of the Holodomor is between 2.5 and 7.5 million. Approximately 1 to 2 million people died during the Kazakh famine.

Recent historians have estimated the death toll in the range of six to 13 million.

== Repressions against the Esperantists ==
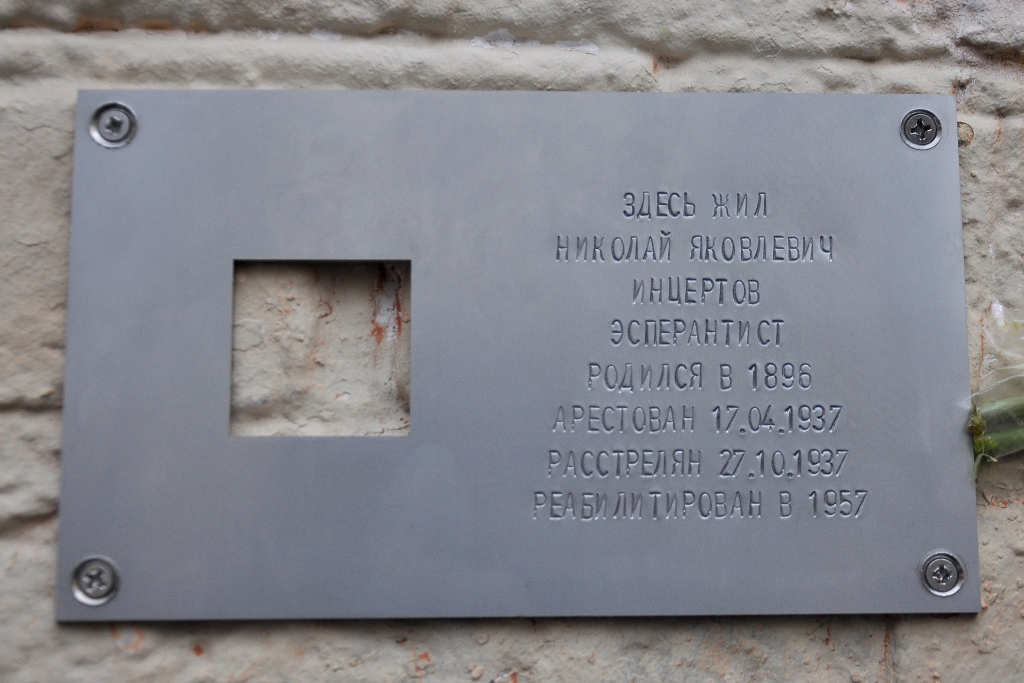
A memorial plaque on the house of Nikolai Insertov, one of the Esperanto scholars kidnapped and executed by the NKVD

The Esperanto language, previously popular in the USSR, was banned from use during the Stalin's era. The last Soviet speakers of this language who lived before World War II were shot or sent to Gulag camps during the Great Purge. During the De-Stalinization era in 1960, the goal was set to revive the Esperanto movement, but it didnt gain widespread popularity, since almost everyone who worked with this language was killed for political reasons and on charges of espionage, and then rehabilitated posthumously due to the lack of evidence of a crime.

== Great Purge ==
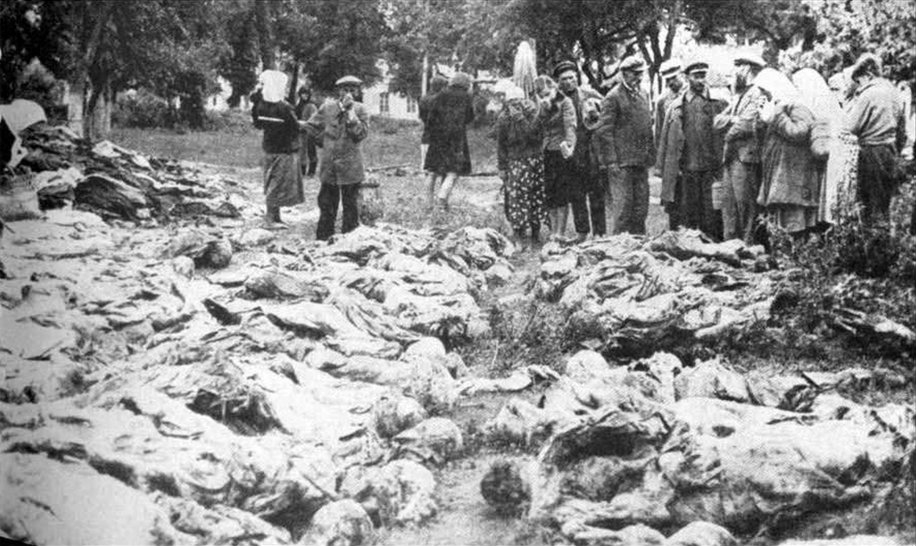
People of Vinnytsia searching through the exhumed victims of the Vinnytsia massacre, 1943

The Great Purge (Russian: Большой террор, transliterated Bolshoy terror, The Great Terror) was a series of campaigns of political repression and persecution in the Soviet Union orchestrated by Joseph Stalin in 1937–1938. It involved the purge of the Communist Party of the Soviet Union, repression of peasants, deportations of ethnic minorities, and the persecution of unaffiliated persons, characterized by widespread police surveillance, widespread suspicion of "saboteurs", imprisonment, and killings. Estimates of the number of deaths associated with the Great Purge run from the official figure of 681,692 to nearly 1,2 million.

== LGBT persecution ==
On September 15, 1933, the deputy head of the OGPU, Genrikh Yagoda reported to Joseph Stalin about the disclosure of the "conspiracy of the homosexual community" in Moscow, Leningrad and Kharkiv. As Yagoda pointed out in the explanatory note, "the conspirators were engaged in the creation of a network of salons and other organized formations, with the subsequent transformation of these associations into direct spy cells".

Stalin ordered "to punish the scumbags" in a demonstrative way, and to introduce a corresponding directive into the legislation. At the first stage, about 130 people were arrested who gave the necessary confessions under torture, and on December 17, 1933, the Presidium of the Central Executive Committee of the USSR decided to extend criminal liability to "unnatural relationship". The article was added to the Criminal Code of the RSFSR on April 1, 1934 in the section "sexual crimes" under number 154-a. "Voluntary" sexual intercourse between two men was sentenced to three to five years in the camps, and for "cohabitation" with the use of violence - from five to eight.

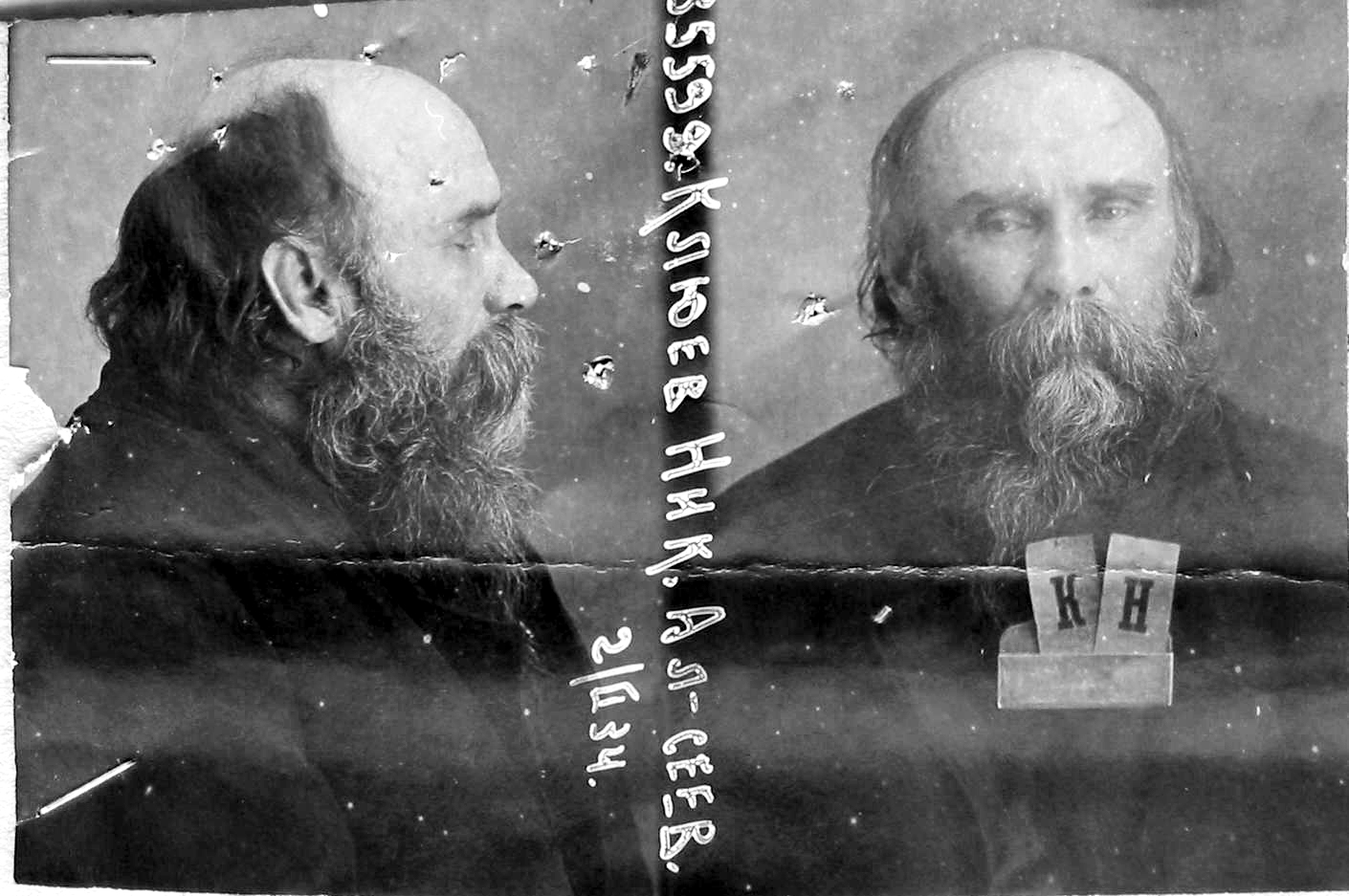
Klyuev after the arrest

Nikolai Klyuev was the first known homosexual to suffer from Soviet repressions. The poet was accused of writing love lyrics that "were written from a male person to a male person." In February 1934, Klyuyev was arrested in his apartment on charges of "composing and distributing counter-revolutionary literary works", and in 1937 he was shot.

In later times, the most famous victim of the Soviet repression against the LGBT community was a film director Sergei Parajanov.

== Population transfers ==
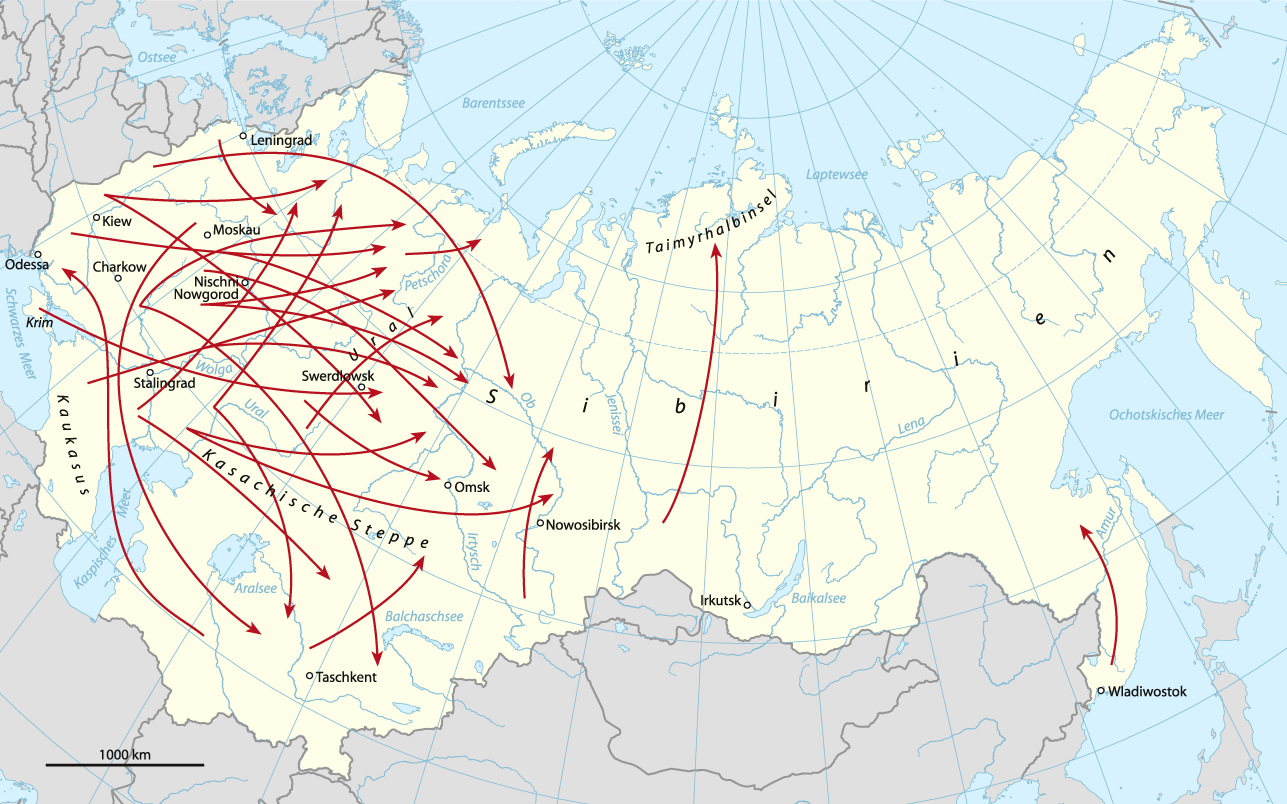
General routes of deportation during the Dekulakization across the Soviet Union in 1930–1931

Population transfer in the Soviet Union may be divided into the following broad categories: deportations of "anti-Soviet" categories within the population, who were often classified as "enemies of the workers"; deportations of nationalities; labor force transfer; and organised migrations in opposite directions in order to fill the ethnically cleansed territories. In most cases their destinations were underpopulated and remote areas (see Involuntary settlements in the Soviet Union).

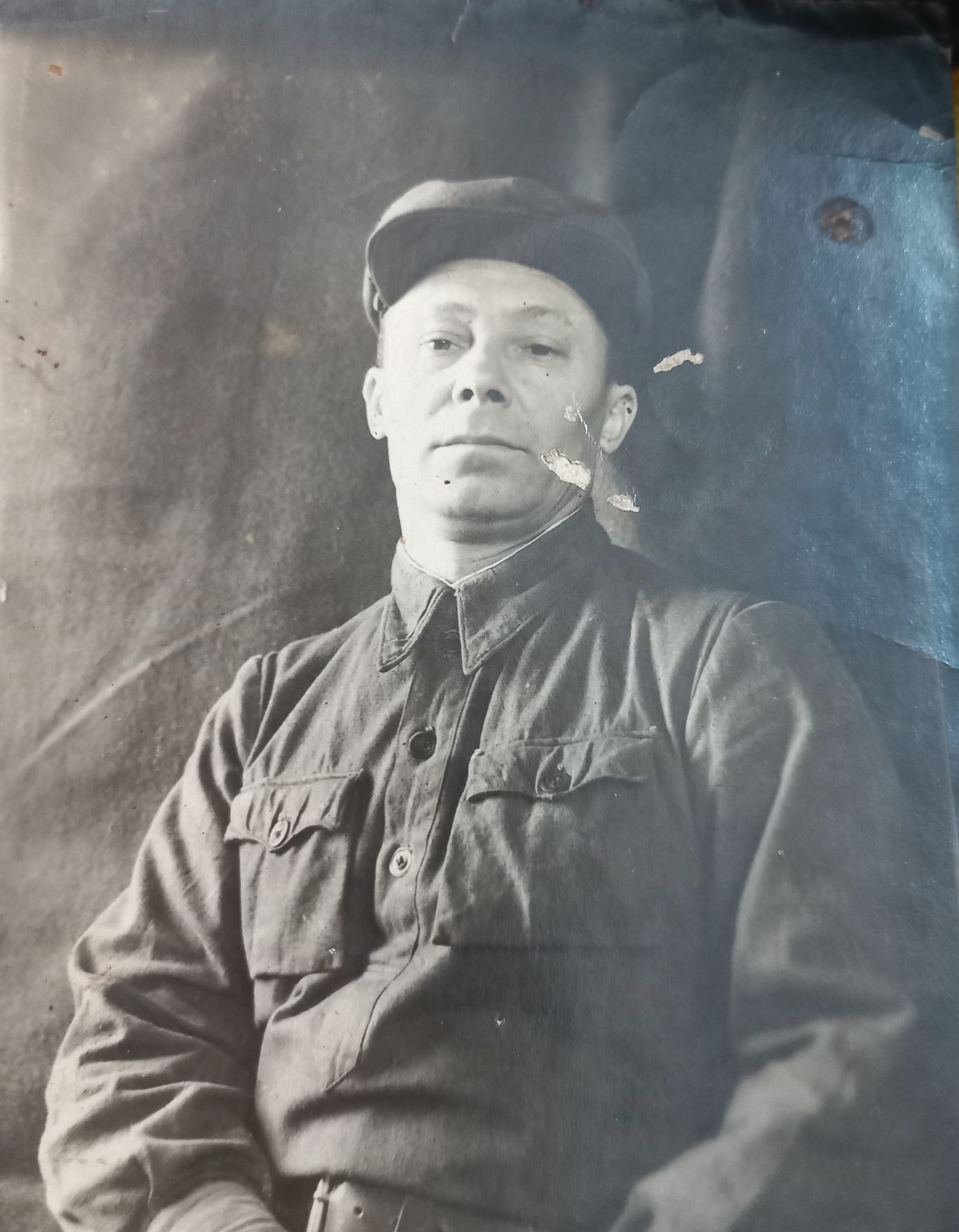
Panas Kravtsov, participant of Winter war and WW2, was deported to Kamchatka

Entire nations and ethnic groups were collectively punished by the Soviet government for their alleged collaboration with the enemy during World War II. At least nine distinct ethnic-linguistic groups, including ethnic Germans, ethnic Greeks, ethnic Poles, Crimean Tatars (recognized as genocide), Balkars, Chechens, and Kalmyks, were deported to remote and unpopulated areas of Siberia (see sybirak) and Kazakhstan. Koreans and Romanians were also deported. Mass operations of the NKVD were needed to deport millions of people, many of whom died. According to various sources, more than 6 million people were deported, with the death toll ranging from 800,000 to 1,500,000 in the USSR only.

== Gulag ==
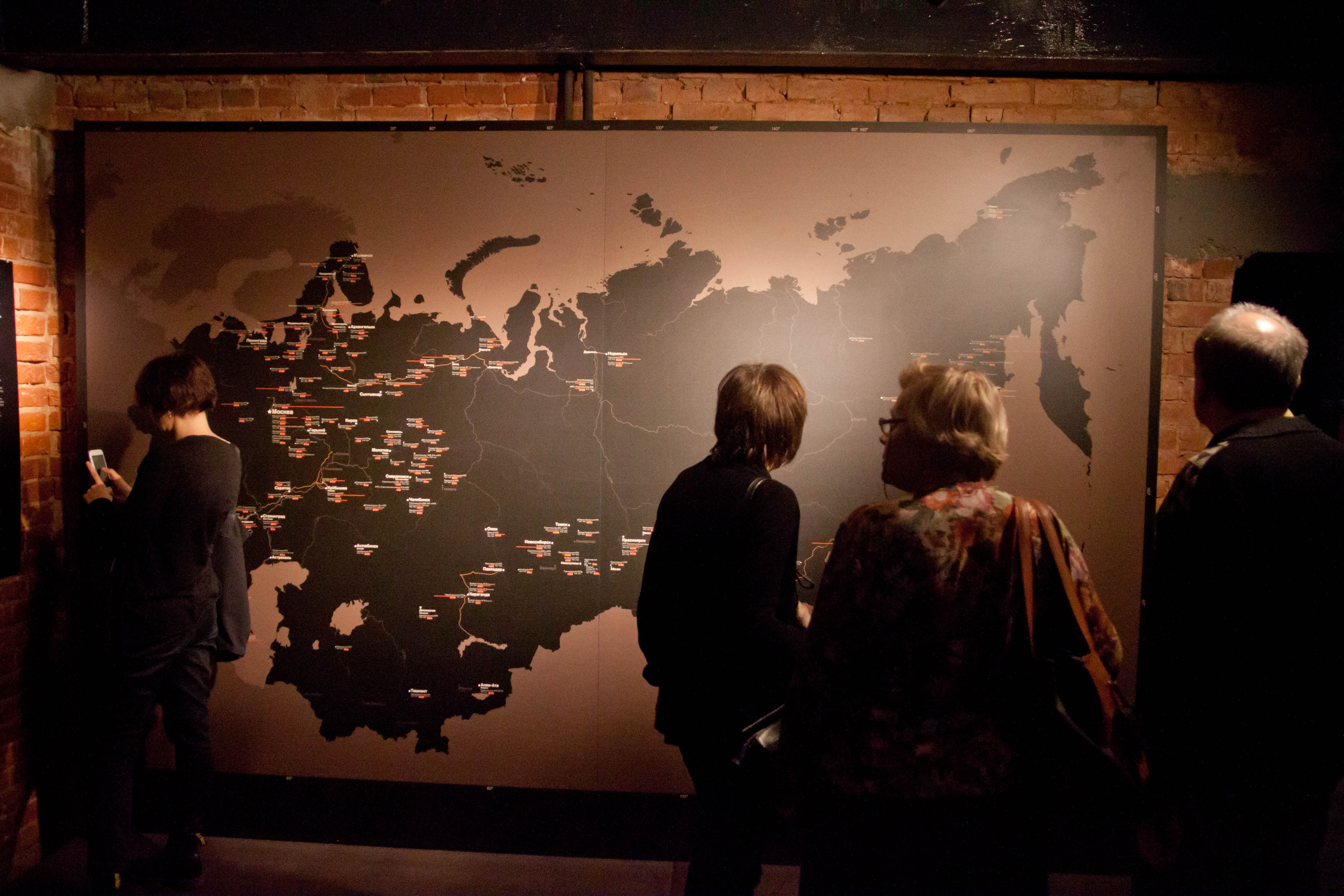
Map of Stalin's concentration camps in the Gulag Museum in Moscow

The Gulag "was the branch of the State Security that operated the penal system of forced labour camps and associated detention and transit camps and prisons. While these camps housed criminals of all types, the Gulag system has become primarily known as a place for political prisoners and as a mechanism for repressing political opposition to the Soviet state."

The occupancy in the Gulag system consisted of approximately a half million people in 1934. The estimated number of prisoners in 1953 lies between 1.8 and 2.4 million, with 0.5 million political prisoners. There are several estimates about the number of people who were once or multiple times in the Gulag system. There are estimates of 14 million between 1929 and 1953, and also one estimate of 25 million people between 1919 and 1928.

It is estimated that 1 million people died in the Gulag camps between 1934 and 1953. In reality the number of deaths caused by the Gulag system is larger, because people who were incurably ill were released from the camps to die elsewhere. If these numbers are taken into account, then the estimate of deaths caused by the Gulag system will be approximately 2.5 million people.

== Repressions in annexed territories ==
During the early years of World War II, the Soviet Union annexed several territories in Eastern Europe as a consequence of the German–Soviet Pact and its Secret Additional Protocol.

=== Baltic States ===
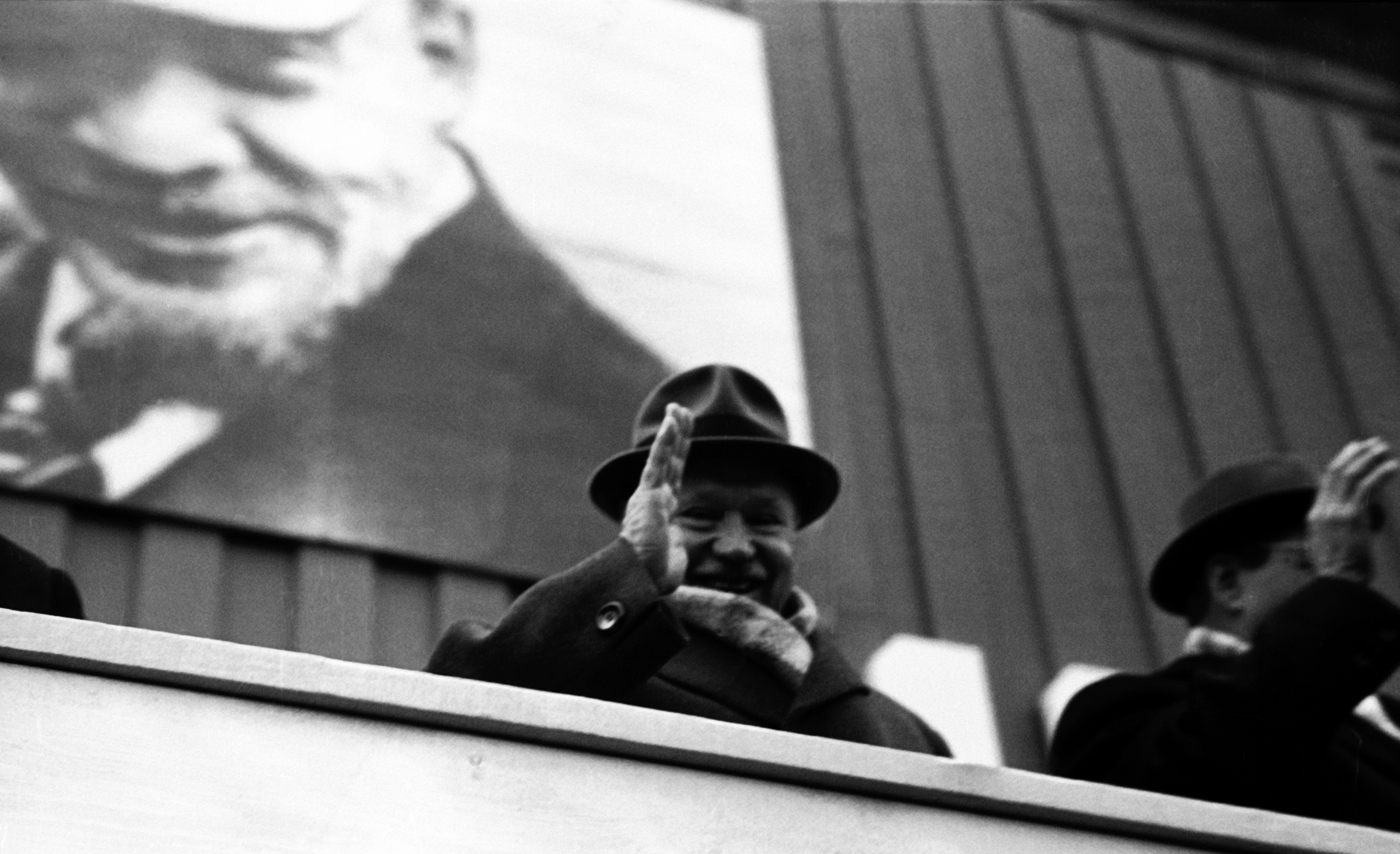
Antanas Sniečkus, the leader of the Communist Party of Lithuania from 1940 to 1974, supervised the mass deportations of Lithuanians.

In the Baltic countries of Estonia, Latvia and Lithuania, repressions and mass deportations were carried out by the Soviets. The Serov Instructions, "On the Procedure for carrying out the Deportation of Anti-Soviet Elements from Lithuania, Latvia, and Estonia", contained detailed procedures and protocols to observe in the deportation of Baltic nationals. Public tribunals were also set up to punish "traitors to the people": those who had fallen short of the "political duty" of voting their countries into the USSR. In the first year of Soviet occupation, from June 1940 to June 1941, the number confirmed executed, conscripted, or deported is estimated at a minimum of 124,467: 59,732 in Estonia, 34,250 in Latvia, and 30,485 in Lithuania. This included 8 former heads of state and 38 ministers from Estonia, 3 former heads of state and 15 ministers from Latvia, and the then-president, 5 prime ministers and 24 other ministers from Lithuania.

== Post-Stalin era (1953–1991) ==
After Stalin's death, the suppression of dissent was dramatically reduced and it also took new forms. The internal critics of the system were convicted of anti-Soviet agitation, anti-Soviet slander, or they were accused of being "social parasites". Other critics were accused of being mentally ill, they were accused of having sluggish schizophrenia and incarcerated in "psikhushkas", i.e. mental hospitals which were used as prisons by the Soviet authorities. A number of notable dissidents, including Aleksandr Solzhenitsyn, Vladimir Bukovsky, and Andrei Sakharov, were sent to internal or external exile.

The armed forces of the Soviet Union were also used for the repression of political unrest in countries of the Warsaw Pact, as for example during the Hungarian Uprising of 1956 and the Prague Spring of 1968.

== Loss of life ==
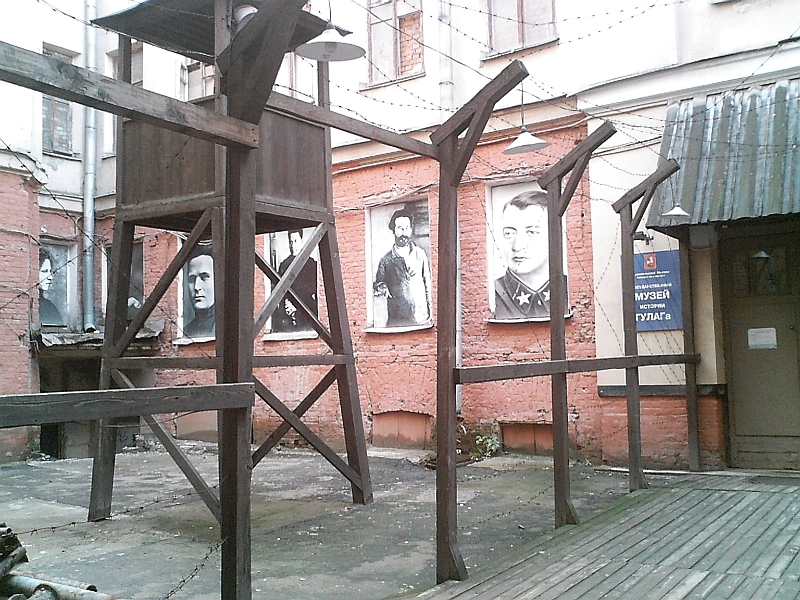
Gulag History Museum in Moscow was founded in 2001 by historian Anton Antonov-Ovseyenko

Estimates of the number of deaths attributable specifically to Joseph Stalin vary widely. Some scholars assert that record-keeping of the executions of political prisoners and ethnic minorities are neither reliable nor complete; others contend archival materials contain irrefutable data far superior to sources utilized prior to 1991, such as statements from emigres and other informants. Those historians working after the Soviet Union's dissolution have estimated victim totals ranging from approximately 3 million to nearly 9 million. Some scholars still assert that the death toll could be in the tens of millions.

American historian Richard Pipes notes, "Censuses revealed that between 1932 and 1939—that is, after collectivization but before World War II—the population decreased by 9 to 10 million people. In his most recent edition of The Great Terror (2007), Robert Conquest states that while exact numbers may never be known with complete certainty, at least 15 million people were killed "by the whole range of Soviet regime's terrors". Rudolph Rummel in 2006 said that the earlier higher victim total estimates are correct, although he includes those killed by the government of the Soviet Union in other Eastern European countries as well. Conversely, J. Arch Getty and Stephen G. Wheatcroft insist that the opening of the Soviet archives has vindicated the lower estimates put forth by "revisionist" scholars. Simon Sebag Montefiore in 2003 suggested that Stalin was ultimately responsible for the deaths of at least 20 million people.

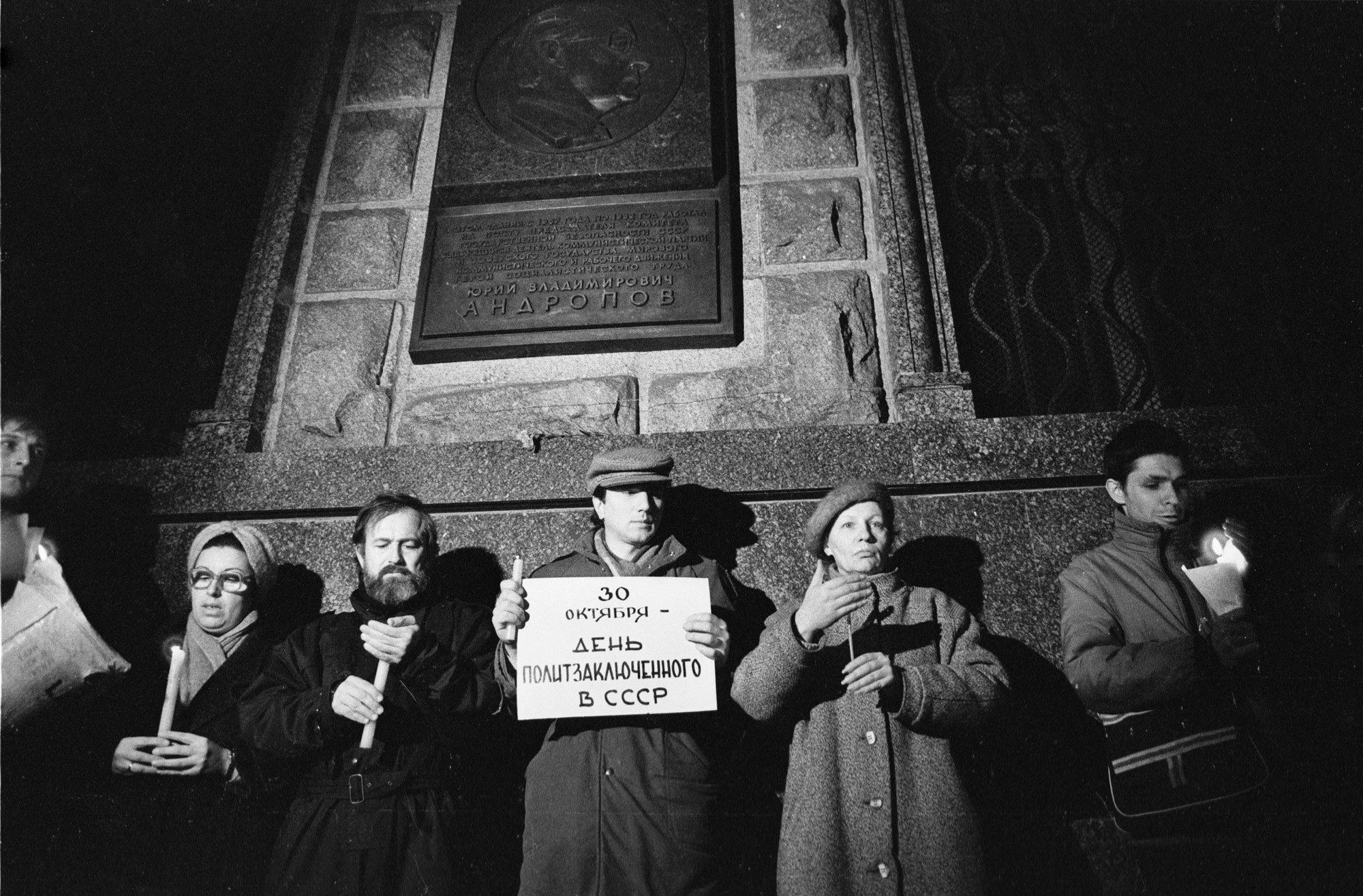
Living ring around the KGB building in Moscow on Political Prisoner Day, October 30, 1989

Some of these estimates rely in part on demographic losses. Conquest explained how he arrived at his estimate: "I suggest about eleven million by the beginning of 1937, and about three million over the period 1937–38, making fourteen million. The eleven-odd million is readily deduced from the undisputed population deficit shown in the suppressed census of January 1937, of fifteen to sixteen million, by making reasonable assumptions about how this was divided between birth deficit and deaths."

Australian historian Stephen G. Wheatcroft claims that prior to the opening of the archives for historical research, "our understanding of the scale and the nature of Soviet repression has been extremely poor" and that some specialists who wish to maintain earlier high estimates of the Stalinist death toll are "finding it difficult to adapt to the new circumstances when the archives are open and when there are plenty of irrefutable data" and instead "hang on to their old Sovietological methods with round-about calculations based on odd statements from emigres and other informants who are supposed to have superior knowledge." Conversely, some historians believe that the official archival figures of the categories that were recorded by Soviet authorities are unreliable and incomplete. In addition to failures regarding comprehensive recordings, as one additional example, Canadian historian Robert Gellately and British historian Simon Sebag Montefiore argue that the many suspects beaten and tortured to death while in "investigative custody" were likely not to have been counted amongst the executed.

Victims of repression and famine
Event	Deaths	References
1- Red Terror	50,000 – 2,000,000	
2- Dekulakization	389,521 – 5,000,000	
3- Gulag	1,053,829 - 2,500,000	
4- Great Purge	683,692 – 1,200,000	
5- Deportation of national minorities	450,000 – 1,500,000	
A- Repression outside of famine	2,627,042 – 12,200,000	Sum of 1, 2, 3, 4, and 5 above
6- Russian famine of 1921–1922	1,000,000 – 5,000,000	
7- Soviet famine of 1930–1933	5,700,000 – 8,700,000	
8- Soviet famine of 1946–1947	500,000 - 2,000,000	
B- Famine deaths	7,200,000 – 15,700,000	Sum of 6,7 and 8 above
Total	9,827,042 – 27,900,000	Sum of A and B above

== Remembering the victims ==
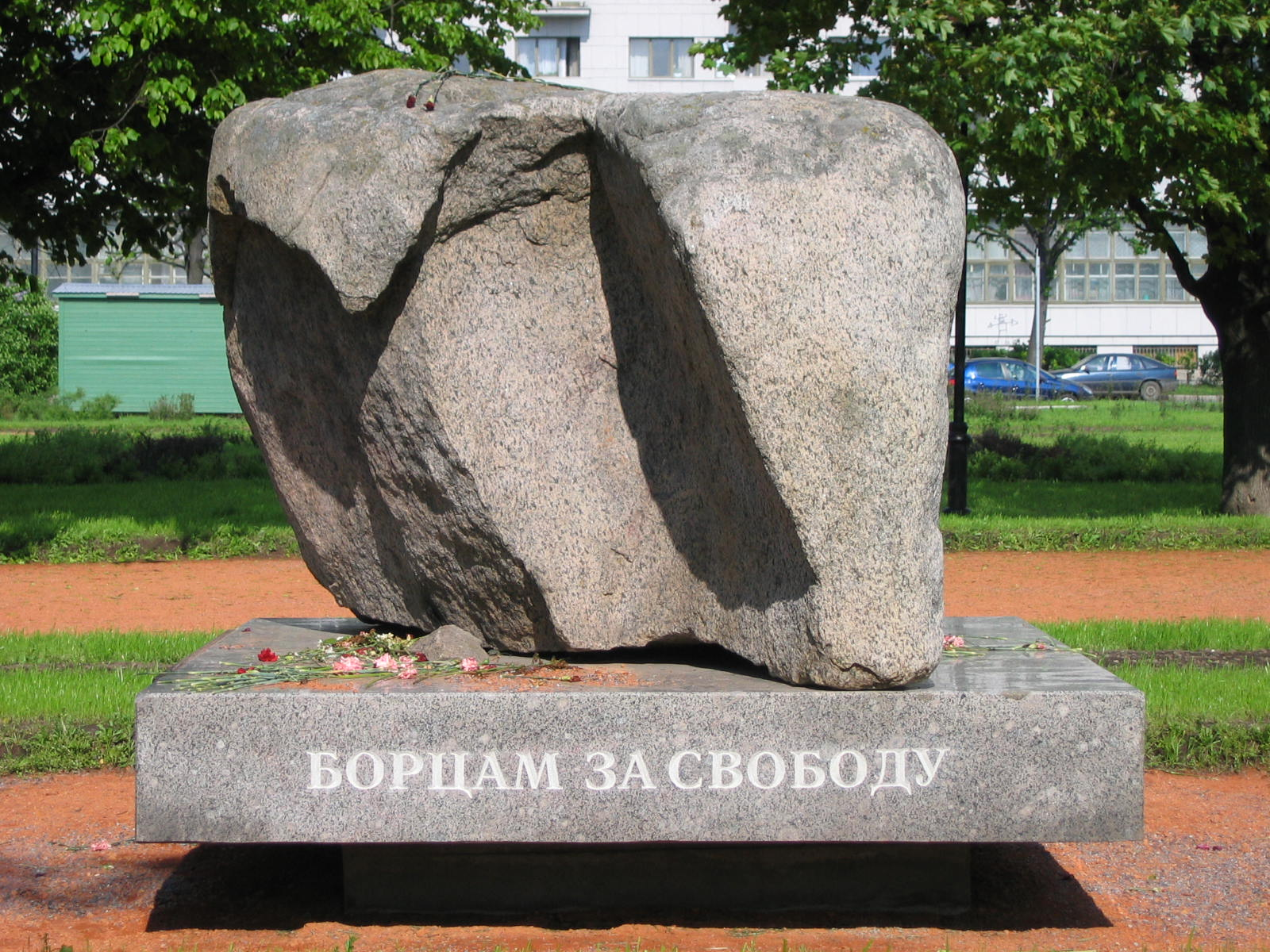
The Gulag Memorial in St Petersburg made of a boulder from the Solovki camp—the first prison camp in the Gulag system. People gather here every year on the Day of Remembrance of Victims of the Repression (October 30)

A Day of Remembrance for the Victims of Political Repression (День памяти жертв политических репрессий) has been officially held on 30 October in Russia since 1991. It is also marked in other former Soviet republics except Ukraine, which has its own annual Day of Remembrance for the victims of political repressions by the Soviet regime, held each year on the third Sunday of May.

Members of the Memorial society took an active part in such commemorative meetings. Since 2007, Memorial had also organised the day-long "Restoring the Names" ceremony at the Solovetsky Stone in Moscow every 29 October. The organization was banned by the Russian government in 2022. Some of Memorial's human rights activities have continued in Russia.

The Wall of Grief in Moscow, inaugurated in October 2017, is Russia's first monument ordered by presidential decree for people killed during the Stalinist repressions in the Soviet Union.

== See also ==
- Active measures
- Crimes against humanity under communist regimes
- Criticism of communist party rule
- Goli Otok
- Hitler Youth conspiracy
- Human rights in the Soviet Union
- Mass killings under communist regimes
- Persecution of Christians in the Soviet Union
- Persecution of Christians in the Eastern Bloc
- Political abuse of psychiatry in the Soviet Union
- Rehabilitation (Soviet)
- Law of the Soviet Union
- Politics of the Soviet Union
- Soviet repressions in Belarus
- The Black Book of Communism
- Anti-religious campaign during the Russian Civil War (1917–1921)
- RSFSR and USSR anti-religious campaign (1921–1928)
- USSR anti-religious campaign (1928–1941)
- USSR anti-religious campaign (1958–1964)
- USSR anti-religious campaign (1970s–1987)
