= Kazakh famine =

Kazakh famine may refer to:

- Kazakh famine of 1919–1922, a period of mass starvation and drought in the Kirghiz and Turkestan ASSRs
- Kazakh famine of 1930–1933, a man-made famine in the Kazakh ASSR
