= 1921–1922 famine in Tatarstan =

Mass starvation in the Tatar ASSR

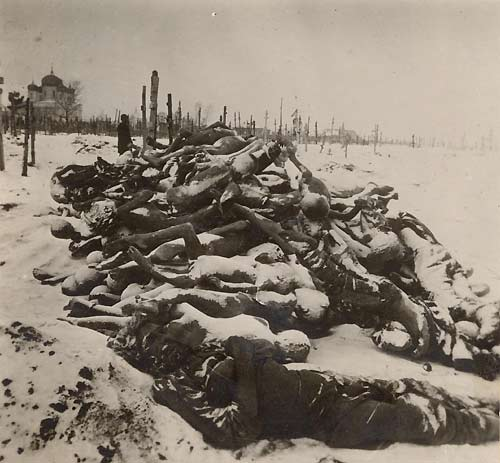
- Victims of the famine in Buzuluk, 1921
- Country: Soviet Union
- Location: Tatar ASSR
- Period: 1921–1922
- Total deaths: 500,000–2,000,000
- Causes: Failures of collectivization
- Relief: Aid provided by the Tatpomgol, Workers International Relief, and American Relief Administration
- Effect on demographics: 10% of the Tatar ASSR population died while another 13% fled to other parts of the country
- Preceded by: Russian famine of 1891–92
- Succeeded by: Soviet famine of 1932–33

The 1921–1922 famine in Tatarstan was a period of mass starvation and drought that took place in the Tatar ASSR as a result of the Russian Civil War, in which 500,000 to 2,000,000 peasants died. The event was part of the greater Russian famine of 1921–22 that affected other parts of what became the Soviet Union, in which up to 5,000,000 people died in total. According to Roman Serbyn, a Ukrainian professor of Russian and East European history, the Tatarstan famine was the first man-made famine in the Soviet Union and systematically targeted ethnic minorities such as Volga Tatars and Volga Germans.

== Background ==
Soviet leadership had long sought to suppress Tatar nationalism. Tatars were frequently charged with "bourgeois nationalism" and other revisionist crimes. Tatar leadership was executed or imprisoned, which many fled the USSR to Turkey for refuge. Collectivization of Tatar agriculture began in 1921. According to historian James Minahan, Crimean Tatars in particular "suffered proportionally greater population losses than any other Soviet national group during the first decades of Soviet rule." Farming methods in the Tatar ASSR were outdated, similar to most non-Russian nationalities in the Soviet Union. In addition, very few indigenous Tatar proletariats existed due to Russian imperial dominance.

== Famine ==
In early spring of 1921, the Cheka reported massive protests and riots among peasants. By 23 March, reports began to describe the developments in some kantons as a "famine" and documented peasants starving to death and committing suicide. In response to the lack of food, many peasants prevented grain trucks from leaving Tatarstan and some refused to sow their fields. The famine also saw a large rise in the number of children submitted to orphanages, with poorer parents leaving their children in state institutions and some just abandoning them on the streets to fend for themselves. Orphanages could not keep up with demand, and the Tatar ASSR government devoted resources to expand the number of institutions available. For example, the Sviyazhsk kanton had two orphanages, which kept 64 children in July 1920. By, January 1922, this had expanded to 12 orphanages with 704 children.

By March 1922, some villages had lost half their population. The famine also led to a sharp decline in the number of livestock and farming equipment as starving peasants sold off their property or slaughtered the draft animals for food. KGB records from the time note the deaths of at least 500,000 people in Tatarstan, but more recent estimates conclude the actual value was much higher at 2,000,000. Historian James Long approximates that roughly 13% of the Tatar ASSR population fled to other parts of the country while another 10% died.

== Relief ==
In the summer of 1922, the special committee Tatpomgol was established to cope with the famine. By August 1922, Tatpomgol imported 8 million pood of food, including 2 million pounds of seed, with a loan. From the affected regions, hundreds of thousands of people, mostly children, were evacuated to Central Asia, Belarus and Siberia. Emergency feeding points were established throughout the republic. The Soviet government invited international organizations, such as Workers International Relief to assist. The United States government provided aid to starving Tatars in from 1920 to 1923 through the American Relief Administration.

== Aftermath ==
Though the most hard-hitting phase of the famine ended in 1922, shortages, starvation, and illness continued in the Volga region throughout 1923 and into 1924, and the Soviet government settled ethnic Russians into the Tatar ASSR and in Idel-Ural region in this time causing the Tatars' share of the population to eventually decline to less than 50%.

In 2008, the All-Russian Tatar Social Center (VTOTs) asked the United Nations to condemn the 1921–22 Tatarstan famine as genocide of Muslim Tatars.

== See also ==
- Droughts and famines in Russia and the Soviet Union
- Kazakh famine of 1919–1922
- Russian famine of 1921–1922

== Sources ==
- Millar, James R. (2004). Encyclopedia of Russian History Volume 2: A-D. New York, USA: Macmillan Reference. ISBN 0-02-865907-4.
- Mizelle, Peter Christopher (May 2002). "Battle with Famine:" Soviet Relief and the Tatar Republic 1921-1922. District of Columbia, USA: University of Virginia.
- Dronin, N. M.; Bellinger, E. G. (2005). Climate Dependence and Food Problems in Russia, 1900-1990: The Interaction of Climate and Agricultural Policy and Their Effect on Food Problems. Central European University Press. ISBN 9789637326103.
