= Droughts and famines in Russia and the Soviet Union =

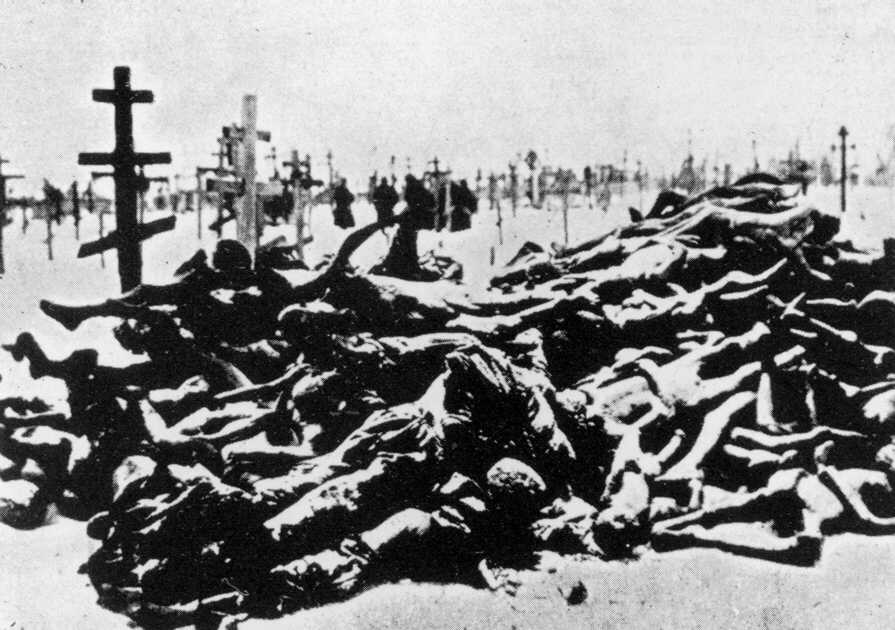
An American charity postcard showing corpses caused by the deadly Russian famine of 1921–1922

Throughout the history of Russia and Soviet Union, famines, droughts and crop failures occurred on the territory of Russia, the Russian Empire and the Soviet Union on more or less regular basis. From the beginning of the 11th to the end of the 16th century, on the territory of Russia for every century there were 8 crop failures, which were repeated every 13 years, sometimes causing prolonged famine in a significant territory. The causes of famine were different, from natural (crop failures due to drought or disease) and economic and political crises; for example, the Soviet famine of 1930–1933, which includes the Holodomor, the cause of which was, among other factors, the collectivization policy in the USSR, which affected the territory of the Volga region in Russia, Ukraine and Kazakhstan.

== Pre-1900 droughts and famines ==
The famine of 1601–1603 is believed to be Russia's worst in terms of the portion of the population affected, as it may have killed 2 million people (1/3 of the population). Other major famines include the Great Famine of 1315–1317, which affected much of Europe, including part of Russia as well as the Baltic states. The Nikonian chronicle, written between 1127 and 1303, recorded no less than eleven famine years during that period. One of the most serious crises before 1900 was the famine of 1891–1892, which killed between 375,000 and 500,000 people, mainly due to famine-related diseases. Causes included a large autumn drought resulting in crop failures. Attempts by the government to alleviate the situation generally failed which may have contributed to a lack of faith in the Tsarist government and later political instability. In 1899, the Volga area, especially Samara, suffered starvation, typhus and scurvy, which depleted Red Cross aid.

The Red Cross staff also reported to the Minister of Agriculture and the head of the Committee for the provision of medical care to the population Alexey Ermolov that he was unable to identify any deaths directly from starvation.The same position was expressed by Leo Tolstoy, who studied famines in Russia, and he stated that there was no "Indian famine" (i.e., death) in Russia either in 1892 or 1896.

== List of post-1900 droughts and famines ==
The Golubev and Dronin report gives the following table of the major droughts in Russia between 1900 and 2000. Mass famines were reported in years of drought in the 1920s and 1930s, and the last drought occurred in 1984.

- Central: 1920, 1924, 1936, 1946, 1984.
- Southern: 1901, 1906, 1921, 1939, 1948, 1995.
- Eastern: 1911, 1931.

== 1900s ==
Tsarist Russia experienced a famine in 1901–1902 (affecting 49 governorates, or guberniyas), and again between 1906 and 1908 (affecting 19 to 29 governorates). However, there were also no deaths, moreover, in starving regions the population steadily increased and the mortality rate decreased.

== 1910s ==
During the Russian Revolution of 1917 and subsequent Russian Civil War, there was a dramatic decline in total agricultural output. The 1920 grain harvest was only 46.1 million tons, compared to 80.1 million in 1913. By 1926, it had almost returned to pre-revolutionary levels, reaching 76.8 million tons.

== 1920s ==
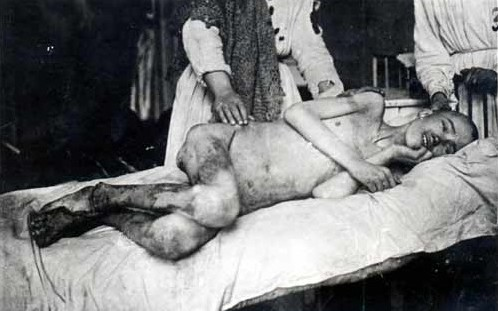
Starving boy, c. 1921

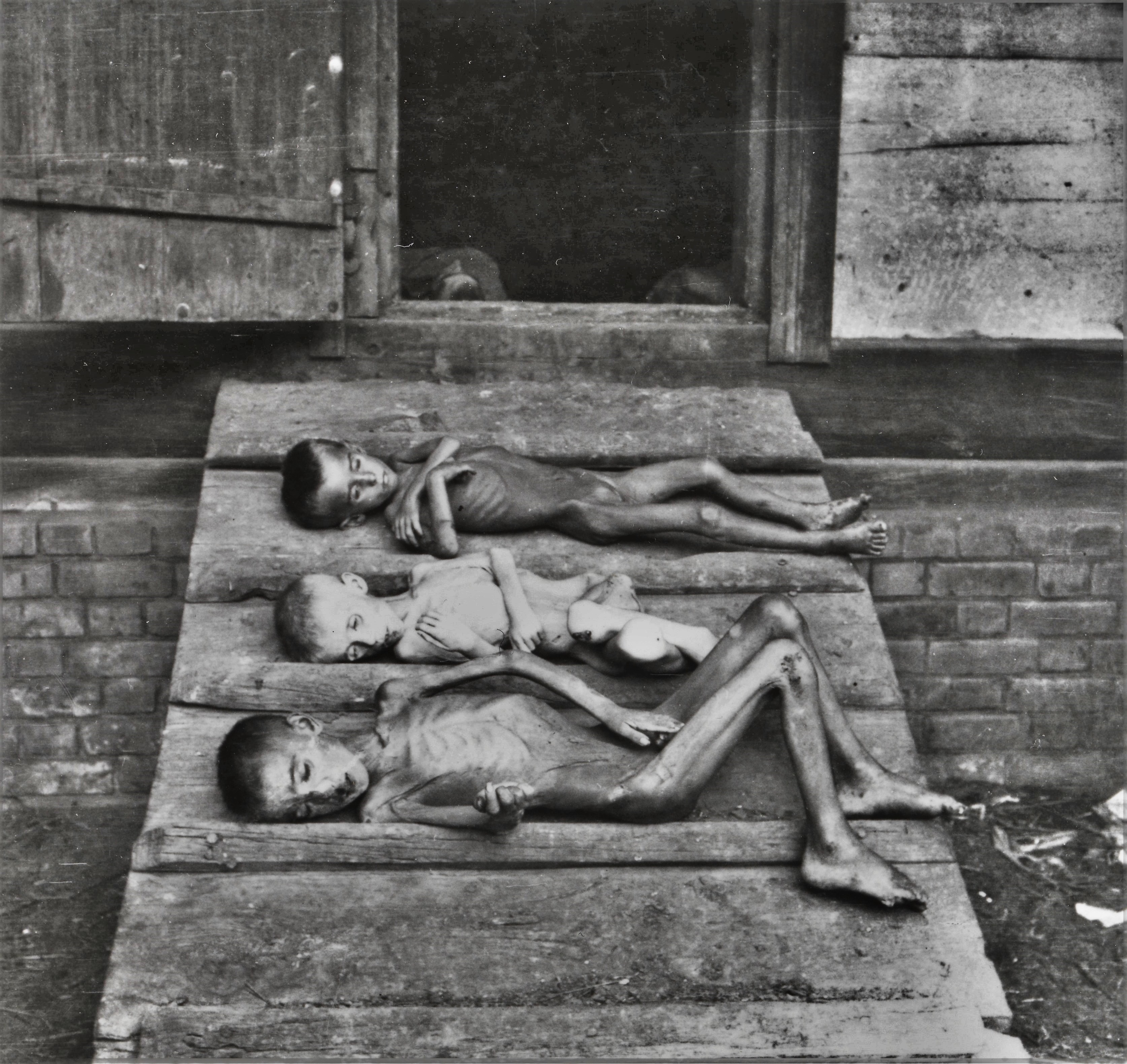
Three children who are dead from starvation, 1921

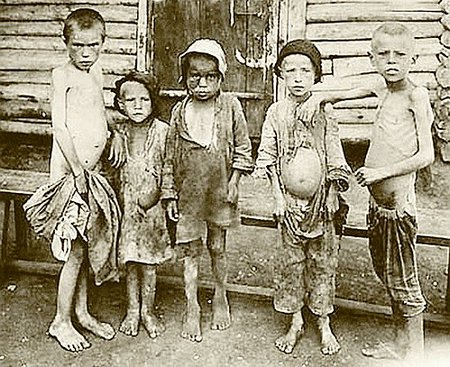
Starving children in 1922

The early 1920s saw a series of famines. The deadly Russian famine of 1921–1922 happened as a result of the ongoing civil war and garnered wide international attention, the most affected area being the Southeastern areas of European Russia (including the Volga region, especially the national republics of Idel-Ural, see 1921–22 famine in Tatarstan) and in Ukraine. An estimated 16 million people may have been affected. Fridtjof Nansen was honored with the 1922 Nobel Peace Prize, in part for his work as High Commissioner for Relief In Russia. Other organizations that helped to combat the Soviet famine were the International Save the Children Union and the International Committee of the Red Cross.

After the outbreak of the Russian famine of 1921–1923, the European director of the American Relief Administration, Walter Lyman Brown, began negotiations with Soviet deputy People's Commissar for Foreign Affairs, Maxim Litvinov, in Riga, Latvia. An agreement was reached on August 21, 1921, and an additional implementation agreement was signed by Brown and People's Commissar for Foreign Trade Leonid Krasin on December 30, 1921. The U.S. Congress appropriated $20,000,000 for relief under the Russian Famine Relief Act of late 1921. At its peak, the ARA employed 300 Americans, more than 120,000 Russians and fed 10.5 million people daily. Its Russian operations were headed by Col. William N. Haskell. The Medical Division of the ARA functioned from November 1921 to June 1923 and helped overcome the typhus epidemic then ravaging Soviet Russia. The ARA's famine relief operations ran in parallel with much smaller Mennonite, Jewish and Quaker famine relief operations in Russia. The ARA's operations in Russia were shut down on June 15, 1923, after it was discovered that the Soviet Union had clandestinely renewed the export of grain to Europe.

While the Moscow government recognized the famine in Russia, Soviet authorities paid little attention to the 1921–1923 famine in Ukraine. Moreover, Vladimir Lenin ordered the movement of trains full of grain from Ukraine to the Volga region, Moscow, and Petrograd, to combat starvation there; 1,127 trains were sent between fall 1921 and August 1922.

The Western Entente blockade and wartime embargoes on Soviet Russia have also been identified as an contributing factor to the growth of famine.

== Soviet famine of 1932–1933 ==
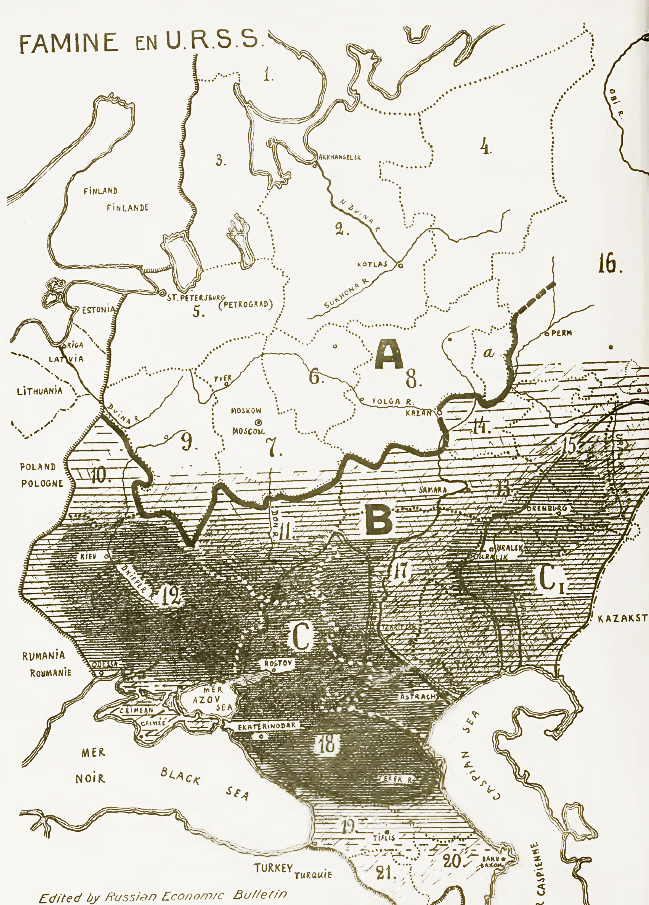
Areas of most disastrous Soviet famine of 1932–1933 marked with black

The second major Soviet famine happened during the initial push for collectivization during the 1930s. Major causes include the 1932–33 confiscations of grain and other food by the Soviet authorities which contributed to the famine and affected more than forty million people, especially in the south on the Don and Kuban areas and in Ukraine, where by various estimates millions starved to death or died due to famine-related illness (the event known as Holodomor). The famine was perhaps most severe in Kazakhstan where the semi-nomadic pastoralists' traditional way of life was most disturbed by Soviet agricultural ambitions.

=== Demographic impact ===
One demographic retrojection suggests a figure of 2.5 million famine deaths for Soviet Ukraine and Kuban region. This is too close to the recorded figure of excess deaths, which is about 2.4 million. The latter figure must be substantially low, since many deaths were not recorded. Another demographic calculation, carried out on behalf of the authorities of independent Ukraine, provides the figure of 3.9 million dead. The truth is probably in between these numbers, where most of the estimates of respectable scholars can be found. It seems reasonable to propose a figure of approximately 3.3 million deaths by starvation and hunger-related disease in Soviet Ukraine in 1932–1933.

— Timothy Snyder, Bloodlands: Europe Between Hitler and Stalin

The demographic impact of the famine of 1932–1933 was multifold. In addition to direct and indirect deaths associated with the famine, there were significant internal migrations of Soviet citizens, often fleeing famine-ridden regions. A sudden decline in birthrates permanently "scarred" the long-term population growth of the Soviet Union in a way similar to that of World War II.

Estimates of Soviet deaths attributable to the 1932–1933 famine vary wildly, but are typically given in the range of millions. Vallin et al. estimated that the disasters of the decade culminated in a dramatic fall in fertility and a rise in mortality. Their estimates suggest that total losses can be put at about 4.6 million, 0.9 million of which was due to forced migration, 1 million to a deficit in births, and 2.6 million to exceptional mortality. The long-term demographic consequences of collectivization and the Second World War meant that the Soviet Union's 1989 population was 288 million rather than 315 million, 9% lower than it otherwise would have been. In addition to the deaths, the famine resulted in massive population movements, as about 300,000 Kazakh nomads fled to China, Iran, Mongolia and Afghanistan during the famine. A 2020 Journal of Genocide Research article by Oleh Wolowyna estimated 8.7 million deaths across the entire Soviet Union including 3.9 million in Ukraine, 3.3 million in Russia, and 1.3 million in Kazakhstan, plus a lower number of dead in other republics.

Although famines were taking place in various parts of the USSR in 1932–1933, for example in Kazakhstan, parts of Russia and the Volga German Republic, the name Holodomor is specifically applied to the events that took place in territories populated by Ukrainians and also North Caucasian Kazakhs.

=== Legacy ===
The legacy of Holodomor remains a sensitive and controversial issue in contemporary Ukraine where it is regarded as an act of genocide by the government and is generally remembered as one of the greatest tragedies in the nation's history. The question of whether Holodomor was an intentional act of genocide has often been a subject of dispute between the Russian Federation and Ukrainian governments. The modern Russian government has generally attempted to disassociate and downplay any links between itself and the famine.

There is still debate over whether or not Holodomor was a massive failure of policy or a deliberate act of genocide. Robert Conquest held the view that the famine was not intentionally inflicted by Stalin, but "with resulting famine imminent, he could have prevented it, but put "Soviet interest" other than feeding the starving first—thus consciously abetting it". while Michael Ellman's analysis of the famine found that "there is some evidence that in 1930-33 ... Stalin also used starvation in his war against the peasants", which he calls a "conscious policy of starvation", but concludes that there were several factors, primarily focusing on the leadership's culpability in continuing to prioritize collectivization and industrialization over preventing mass death, due to their Leninist stance of regarding starvation "as a necessary cost of the progressive policies of industrialisation and the building of socialism", and thus did not "perceive the famine as a humanitarian catastrophe requiring a major effort to relieve distress and hence made only limited relief efforts."

== 1940s ==
During the Siege of Leningrad in Russia by the German Reich, as many as one million people died, while many more went hungry or starved but survived.

The Germans tried to starve out Leningrad in order to break its resistance. Starvation was one of the primary causes of death as the food supply was cut off and strict rationing was enforced. Animals in the city were slaughtered and eaten, and instances of cannibalism were reported.

The last major famine in the USSR happened mainly in 1947 as a cumulative effect of consequences of collectivization, war damage, the severe drought in 1946 in over 50 percent of the grain-productive zone of the country and government social policy and mismanagement of grain reserves. The regions primarily affected were Moldova and South Eastern Ukraine. In Ukraine, between 100,000 and one million people may have perished. In Moldova, according to Soviet officials, the famine claimed the lives of more than 150,000 people, while historians estimate that this figure reaches at least 250,000–300,000 people.

== 1947–1991 ==
After 1947 there were no known famines. The drought of 1963 caused panic and slaughtering of livestock, but there was no risk of famine. After that year the Soviet Union started importing feed grains for its livestock in increasing amounts.

== Post-Soviet Russia ==
Since the collapse of the Soviet Union, there have been occasional issues with hunger and food insecurity in Russia. Both Russia and Ukraine were subject to a series of severe droughts from July 2010 to 2015. The 2010 drought saw wheat production fall by 20% in Russia and subsequently resulted in a temporary ban on grain exports.

== See also ==
- Bibliography of the Asharshylyk
- Bibliography of the Holodomor
- 1921–1922 famine in Tatarstan
- Kazakh famine of 1919–1922
- Kazakh famine of 1930–1933
- Holodomor
- Hunger Plan
- List of famines
- Russian famine of 1921–1922
- Siege of Leningrad
- Soviet famine of 1930–1933
- Soviet famine of 1946–1947
- Trofim Lysenko

=== Notable victims ===
- Aleksey Shakhmatov
- Alexander Blok
