= Kazakh famine of 1930–1933 =

Asharshylyq Ашаршылық
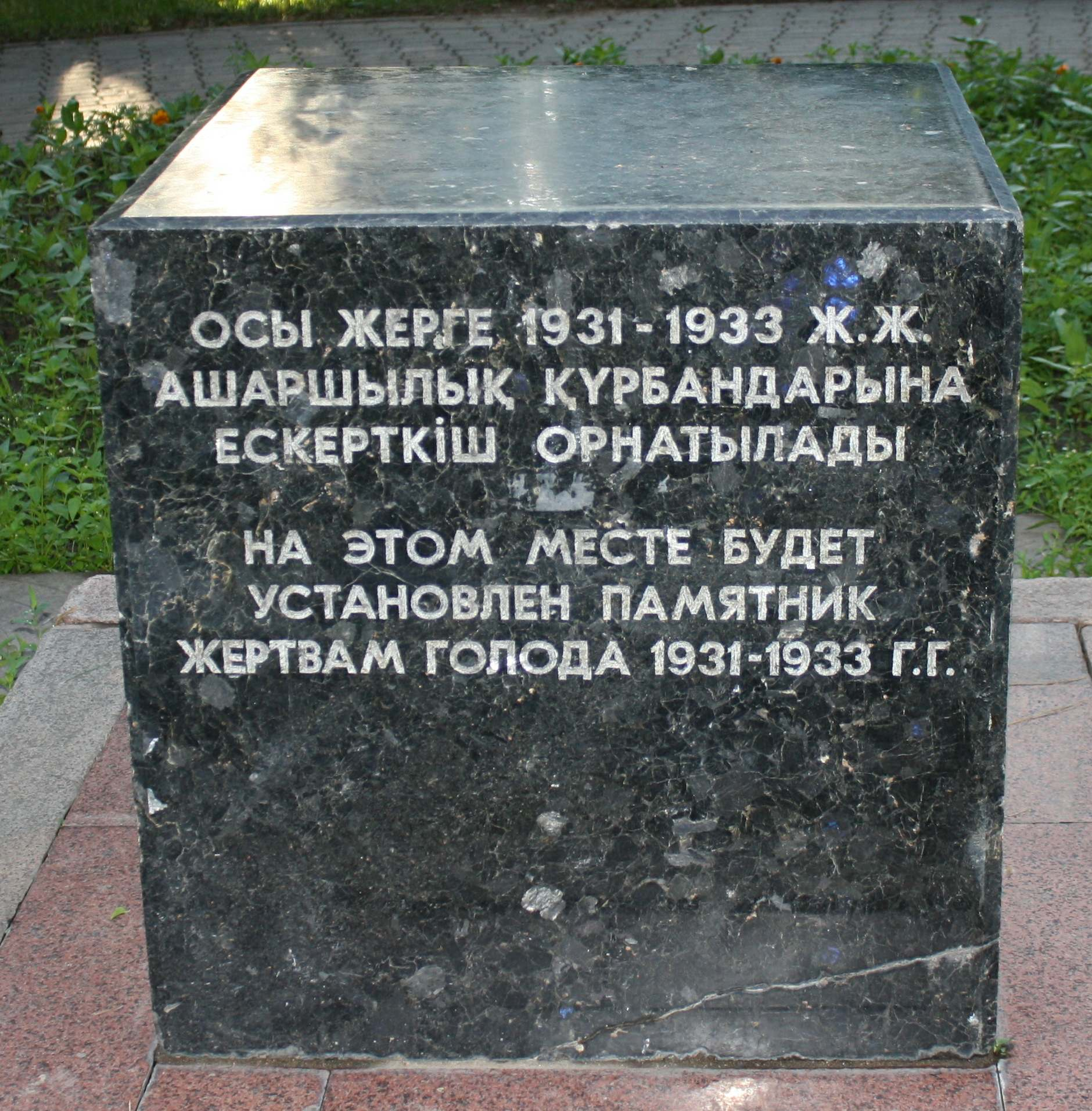
- The cube at the site for the future monument for victims of the famine (dated 1931–1933) in the center of Almaty, Kazakhstan. The monument itself was built in 2017.
- Country: Soviet Union
- Location: Kazakhstan, Russian SFSR
- Period: 1930–1933
- Total deaths: 1.5–2.3 million
- Refugees: 665,000 to 1.1 million
- Causes: Forced collectivization under Filipp Goloshchyokin
- Effect on demographics: 38-42% of the entire Kazakh population died
- Consequences: Kazakhs reduced from 60% to 38% of the republic's population; sedentarization of the nomadic Kazakh people
- Preceded by: Kazakh famine of 1919–1922

The Kazakh famine of 1930–1933, also known as the Asharshylyq, (Note: Kazakh: Ашаршылық, Aşarşylyq [ɑʃɑrʃəˈɫəq]; meaning 'famine' or 'hunger'.) was a man-made famine in the Kazakh Autonomous Socialist Soviet Republic, then part of the Soviet Union, during which an estimated 1.3 to 2.3 million people died, the majority of them ethnic Kazakhs. Between 38 and 42 percent of all Kazakhs perished, the highest proportion of any ethnic group killed in the Soviet famines of the early 1930s. Other estimates put the number of deaths at about 1.75 million, while some research suggests the toll may have exceeded 2 million.

The famine was a direct result of Soviet collectivization policies, implemented in Kazakhstan under the authority of First Secretary Filipp Goloshchyokin. Traditionally a nomadic people, Kazakhs relied heavily on livestock herding. Collectivization destroyed this system: herds were seized by the state, traditional migrations were disrupted, and communities were forced into collective farms ill-suited for the steppe environment. Hunger was intensified by harsh state requisitioning, the imposition of excessive grain and livestock quotas, and repressive measures such as the blacklisting of entire districts from trade. Thousands of Kazakhs who attempted to escape to neighboring China were shot by border guards, while others died during mass migrations across Central Asia.

The famine began in late 1930, a year before the worst phase of the Ukrainian famine, or Holodomor, and lasted through 1933. Its effects were catastrophic: Kazakhstan's population fell by more than a third, and Kazakhs were reduced from about 60 percent of the republic's inhabitants to 38 percent, making them a minority in their own homeland for decades. Large numbers of survivors fled permanently to China, Afghanistan, and other regions. The famine thus not only killed millions but also transformed the demographic and cultural landscape of Kazakhstan.

Interpretations of the famine remain debated among scholars. Some, including a Kazakh parliamentary commission chaired by historian Manash Kozybayev, have concluded that the famine was a genocide, arguing that Moscow deliberately targeted Kazakhs by pursuing policies that knowingly led to their mass death. Others have concluded that the famine, while primarily man-made, should be seen as part of the wider Soviet famine of 1932–1933, driven by Joseph Stalin's push for rapid industrialization and collectivization, rather than as a targeted national campaign. A middle position suggests that while the famine may not have begun with genocidal intent, Soviet authorities later instrumentalized starvation, selectively punishing Kazakhs for resisting collectivization and undermining their traditional way of life.

Public recognition of the famine was suppressed in the Soviet Union until the period of glasnost in the late 1980s. Since Kazakhstan's independence in 1991, the famine has been increasingly studied and commemorated as one of the greatest tragedies in the nation's history. While international recognition has not reached the level of the Holodomor, the Kazakh famine is often discussed in the broader context of man-made famines, forced collectivization, and mass repression in the Stalinist era.

== Etymology ==
In the Kazakh language, the famine of 1930–1933 is widely referred to as the Asharshylyq or Asharshylyk (Ашаршылық, [ɑʃɑrʃɯˈɫɯq]), a term denoting a state of severe societal deprivation, mass starvation, and extreme hardship caused by a lack of food.

Linguists and historians note a distinct semantic debate regarding the term's origins. According to research by Kazakh scholar Dihan Qamzabekuly, the historically rooted, original Kazakh word for a famine is Ashtyq. Modern linguistic analysis identifies Asharshylyq as a later calque that was introduced into the language over time. Despite this distinction, Asharshylyq has transitioned into the standard, universally recognized designation for the 1930s tragedy in both public discourse and contemporary regional scholarship.

Historically, pastoral nomadic communities on the Kazakh steppe used the word dzhut (or jut) to describe cyclical, severe winter weather conditions. A natural dzhut occurred when thick layers of ice crust formed over the topsoil, preventing livestock from grazing and consequently triggering mass animal mortality and seasonal famines. During the Soviet era, the state heavily suppressed discussion of the man-made political origins of the 1930s crisis. In official state narratives, including mid-to-late 20th-century school textbooks, Soviet authorities deliberately framed the tragedy as "the years of the great dzhut". By structurally conflating the artificial crisis with a traditional environmental dzhut, state education systems attributed the mass mortality of the 1930s to unavoidable natural disasters and droughts rather than the state's aggressive collectivization, livestock confiscation, and grain procurement directives.

=== Historiography and naming conventions ===
Following the dissolution of the Soviet Union and the subsequent opening of state archives in the early 1990s, the historiographical framing of the famine within independent Kazakhstan underwent radical revisions. During this initial post-independence transition, Kazakh historians such as Zhulduzbek Abylkhozhin and Makash Tatimov introduced the term "Goloshchyokin's genocide" into regional academic discourse. This interpretive framework concentrated primary historical responsibility onto Filipp Goloshchyokin, the First Secretary of the Kazakh Regional Committee of the Communist Party, emphasizing personal culpability and institutional contempt toward pastoral populations viewed by Soviet authorities as socio-economically "backward." Scholars note that this highly localized focus closely aligned with traditional Soviet-era narratives that blamed the excesses of collectivization on individual administrative overreach rather than systemic structural directives from Moscow.

By the 21st century, institutional academic scholarship in Kazakhstan largely decoupled itself from the explicit "Goloshchyokin's genocide" designation. In the definitive multi-volume national historical registry, The History of Kazakhstan from Ancient Times to the Present Day (2010; Kazakh: Қазақстан тарихы көне заманнан бүгінге дейін), the term is omitted entirely from the text. Instead, contemporary state historiography classifies the Asharshylyq as a structural "humanitarian catastrophe" rooted in poorly conceptualized economic modernizations, forced sedentarization, and aggregate regional resource shortages. Independent Kazakh political factions and regional textbook publishers periodically utilize the genocide designation, though international and domestic academic consensus frames the mass starvation as a crime against humanity or a destructive product of aggressive state-building, rather than an internationally recognized, target-driven campaign of ethnic annihilation.

== Background ==
In the years leading up to the famine, several interconnected factors played a crucial role in exacerbating the dire situation. The historical context was shaped by a complex interplay of demographic changes and traditional nomadic pastoralism practices in Central Asia, particularly centered around a meat and dairy based diet. The nomadic lifestyle of Kazakhs involved the seasonal movement of herds across vast expanses of steppe as a response to the unpredictable availability of grazing resources, driven by the region's harsh climate and varied terrain. As a result, the reliance on meat from livestock, especially during the long and harsh winters, became a fundamental aspect of survival in the Kazakh steppe.

The demographic landscape also played a crucial role, as the population in the region was marked by a substantial number of nomadic Kazakh herders, contributing to the reliance on livestock for sustenance. The traditional practices of raising animals and consuming their meat were intricately linked to cultural norms and historical traditions of Kazakhstan.

However, the destruction of nomadic pastoralism had its roots in the 19th century with the Russian conquest of Central Asia, which marked a significant turning point. Russian authorities introduced changes that included auctioning fertile land as an effort to lure Russian peasants in the region with a focus on agriculture, aiming to transform the traditional nomadic lifestyle. This alteration in land use and economic activities disrupted the delicate equilibrium that had been maintained by Kazakh pastoralists for millennia, resulting in decreased nomadic mobility and increased consumption of grain. These changes set the stage for further disruptions in the early 20th century, as the region grappled with the aftermath of the Russian Revolution and the subsequent Russian Civil War. The situation was exacerbated by the policy of Prodrazvyorstka adopted by the Bolshevik government, coupled with the already challenging effects of severe intermittent drought, involved requisitioning grain from rural areas to support urban populations and export which led to the Kazakh famine of 1919–1922, with an estimated 400,000 to 2 million people dying in the event.

With the establishment of the Soviet Union in 1922, Kazakhstan was drawn into the sphere of Soviet authority. This transition placed the region under the influence of policies enacted by the Soviet government, particularly the first five-year plan implemented under the leadership of Joseph Stalin. At the heart of these policies was the drive for collectivization of agriculture, a practice which involved in integrating private landholdings and labour into collective farming.

== Overview ==
Signs of the Kazakh famine began emerging in the late 1920s, with the factor being the jut from 1927 to 1928, which was a period of extreme cold in which cattle were starved and were unable to graze.

In 1928, the Soviet authorities started a collectivization campaign to confiscate cattle from richer Kazakhs, who were called bai, known as Little October. The confiscation campaign was carried out by Kazakhs against other Kazakhs, and it was up to those Kazakhs to decide who was a bai and how much to confiscate from them. While nomadic Kazakhs, involved in pasturing, were forcefully placed in collective farms which resulted in decline of adequate grazing. This engagement was intended to make Kazakhs active participants in the transformation of Kazakh society. More than 10,000 bais may have been deported due to the campaign against them. The campaign corresponded to arrests of former members of the Alash movement and repression of religious authorities and practices. Kazakhstan's livestock and grain were largely acquired between 1929 and 1932, with one-third of the republic's cereals being requisitioned and more than 1 million tons confiscated in 1930 to provide food for the cities.

One third of Kazakh livestock was confiscated between 1930 and 1931. The livestock was transferred over to Moscow and Leningrad which in the opinion of Niccolò Pianciola shows that Kazakhs were consciously sacrificed to the imperial hierarchy of consumption. Some Kazakhs were expelled from their land to make room for 200,000 "special settlers" and Gulag prisoners, and some of the inadequate food supply in Kazakhstan went to such prisoners and settlers as well. Food aid to the Kazakhs was selectively distributed to eliminate class enemies. Many Kazakhs were denied food aid as local officials considered them unproductive, and food aid was provided to European workers in the country instead. Despite this, the Kazakhs received some measure of emergency food assistance from the state, though much of it did not arrive or was heavily delayed. Soviet officials sent medical personnel into Kazakhstan to inoculate 200,000 Kazakhs from smallpox.

However, Kazakh victims of the famine were widely discriminated against and expelled from virtually every sector of Kazakhstan's society. Soviet authorities referred to Kazakhs in private memos as "two-legged wolves". As famine raged Soviet authorities continued to procure grain from the Kazakhs, with Stalin explicitly advocating for a "repressive track" in the collection process due to procurements having "undergone sharp declines." In this vein within 1932, 32 out of the less than 200 districts in Kazakhstan that did not meet grain production quotas were blacklisted, meaning that they were prohibited from trading with other villages. As Historian Sarah Cameron describes it in an interview with Harvard University's Davis Center, "[in] a strategy explicitly modeled upon a technique that was used against starving Ukrainians, several regions of Kazakhstan were blacklisted. That essentially entraps starving Kazakhs in zones of death where no food could be found." In 1933, Filipp Goloshchyokin was replaced with Levon Mirzoyan from Armenia, who was repressive particularly toward famine refugees and denied food aid to areas run by cadres who asked for more food for their regions using, in the words of Cameron, "teary telegrams"; in one instance under Mirzoyan's rule, a plenipotentiary shoved food aid documents into his pocket and had a wedding celebration instead of transferring them for a whole month while hundreds of Kazakhs starved. Shortly after his arrival, Mirzoyan announced that those who fled or stole grain were 'enemies' of the Soviet Union, and that the republic would take 'severe measures' against them. However, as Cameron notes, this definition could be extended to every starving refugee in the country. With this campaign, Mirzoyan pushed for the use of brutal punishment such as shootings.

Thousands of Kazakhs violently resisted the collectivization campaign with weapons left over by the white army with 8 rebellions occurring in 1930 alone. In the Mangyshlak Peninsula 15,000 rebels resisted between 1929 and 1931. In one rebellion Kazakh took over the city of Suzak in Irgiz returning confiscated property and destroying grain depots. Rebels also decapitated and cut the ears off of party members upon their takeover of said city. Other Kazakhs in the rebellions fought to reopen previous closed down mosques and free religious leaders. OGPU officials are reported to have drunk the blood of Kazakhs shot during the repression of the rebellions. Lower level cadres often disaffected and joined the rebellions to help fight against Red Army forces.

Prominent Kazakh writer Gabit Musirepov reported finding corpses "stacked like firewood" by the roadside in the Turgai district of Kazakhstan. Another first account testified that "It is not rare to meet a Kazakh family, fleeing from who knows where and dragging behind them a sled, on top of which lies the corpse of a child, who died along the way."

Though he didn't witness it firsthand Welshman Gareth Jones was probably the first journalist to report on the Kazakhstan famine. He was told in March 1933 by a 'German from Central Asia' that "one million at least out of 5 million ... have died of hunger" and also wrote in his diary of "corpses in Kazakhstan. Terrible conditions."

In scholar James Richter's Famine, Memory, and Politics in the Post-Soviet Space: Contrasting Echoes of Collectivization in Ukraine and Kazakhstan, published by Cambridge University Press, many testimonies from survivors are documented:

My first memory is of the moon. It was autumn, cold and we were on the tramp somewhere. Wrapped up, the cart swayed beneath me. A sudden stop, and I saw in the black sky this enormous moon. It was full, round and shone brightly. I lay on my back and couldn't tear myself from the sight for a long time. Turning over, I could clearly see on the ground some kind of thickets with stretched-out, crooked branches; there were a lot of them on both sides of the road: they were people. Stiff and silent they lay on the ground.... It was '31 and we were then moving from a ramshackle aul to Turgai.

== Casualties ==
Kazakhstan included some of the regions affected severely by famine, percentage-wise, although more people died in famine in Soviet Ukraine, which began a year later. In addition to the Kazakh famine of 1919–1922, Kazakhstan lost more than half of its population in 10–15 years due to the actions of the Soviet state. The two Soviet censuses indicated that the number of Kazakhs in Kazakhstan dropped from 3,637,612 in 1926 to 2,181,520 in 1937. Ethnic minorities in Kazakhstan were also significantly affected. The Ukrainian population in Kazakhstan decreased from 859,396 to 549,859 (a reduction of almost 36% of their population) while other ethnic minorities in Kazakhstan lost 12% and 30% of their populations. Ukrainians who died in Kazakhstan are sometimes considered victims of the Holodomor.

=== Refugees ===
"The old aul is now breaking apart, it is moving toward settled life, toward the use of hay fields, toward land cultivation; it is moving from worse land to better land, to state farms, to industry, to collective farm construction."

—Filipp Goloshchyokin, First Secretary of the Kazakh Regional Committee of the Communist Party

Due to starvation, between 665,000 and 1.1 million Kazakhs fled the famine with their cattle outside Kazakhstan to China, Mongolia, Afghanistan, Iran, Turkey, and the Soviet republics of Uzbekistan, Kyrgyzstan, Turkmenistan, Tajikistan, and Russia in search of food and employment in the new industrialization sites of Western Siberia. These refugees took an estimated 900,000 head of cattle with them.

Kazakhs who tried to escape were classified as class enemies and shot. The Soviet government also worked to repatriate them back to Soviet territory. This repatriation process could be brutal, as Kazakh homes were broken into with both refugee and non-refugee Kazakhs being forcibly expelled onto train cars without food, heating, or water. 30% of the refugees died due to epidemics and hunger. Refugees that were repatriated were integrated into collective farms where many were too weak to work, and in a factory within Semipalatinsk half the refugees were fired within a few days with the other half being denied food rations.

Professor K.M. Abzhanov, Director of the Institute of History and Ethnology of the Kazakhstan Academy of Sciences stated that "One-sixth of the indigenous population left their historical homeland forever."

As the refugees fled the famine, the Soviet government made violent attempts to stop them. In one case, relief dealers placed food in the back of a truck to attract refugees, and then locked the refugees inside the truck and dumped them in the middle of the mountains; the fate of these refugees is unknown. Starting from 1930 onward thousands of Kazakhs were shot dead as they attempted to flee to China, such as in one infamous killing of 18 to 19 Kazakhs by state border guards called the Karatal Affair which not only had killings but also the rape of several women and children occurring in the incident as noted by a doctor who analyzed the event. The flight of refugees was framed by authorities as a progressive occurrence of nomads moving away from their 'primitive' lifestyle. Famine refugees were suspected by OGPU officials of maintaining counterrevolutionary, bai, and kulak 'tendencies', due to some refugees engaging in crime in the republics they arrived in.

Swiss reporter Ella Maillart, who traveled through Soviet Central Asia and China in the early 1930s, witnessed and wrote of viewing the firsthand effects of the repatriation campaign:

In every wagon carrying merchandise there were Kazakh families wearing rags. They killed time picking lice from each other.... The train stops in the middle of a parched region. Packed alongside the railway are camels, cotton that is unloaded and weighed, piles of wheat in the open air. From the Kazakh wagons comes a muted hammering sound repeated the length of the train. Intrigued, I discover women pounding grain in mortars and making flour. The children ask to be lowered to the ground; they are wearing a quarter of a shirt on their shoulders and have scabs on their heads. A woman replaces her white turban, her only piece of clothing not in tatters, and I see her greasy hair and silver earrings. Her infant, clutching her dress and with skinny legs from which his boney knees protrude; his small behind is devoid of muscle, a small mass of rubbery, much-wrinkled skin. Where do they come from? Where are they going?

One report from an officer in Siberia reads: "When one thinks of the extreme distress in which Kazakhs live here with us, one can easily imagine that things in Kazakhstan are much worse."

Mariam Hakimzhanova describes the situation as follows:

Crowds of crying people gathered near our student cafeteria. Most of them were women. They all had children: some were holding their children in their arms, others were leading them by the hand. The children were crying desperately: "Na-an, na-an" ("bread, bread"). Their cries were heartbreaking. "My dear ones, please give the crying child something to eat", whispered the thin women in weak voices. Their pleading gaze hurt my heart.

=== Cannibalism ===
Some of the starving became so desperate that they resorted to cannibalism. This ranged from consuming corpses to acts of murder in order to eat. Similar acts occurred during the parallel famine in Ukraine, as Ukrainians and Kazakhs were starved under the same tactics. As Timothy Snyder wrote of the Soviet-imposed famines:

Survival was a moral as well as a physical struggle. A woman doctor wrote to a friend in June 1933 that she had not yet become a cannibal, but was "not sure that I shall not be one by the time my letter reaches you." The good people died first. Those who refused to steal or to prostitute themselves died. Those who gave food to others died. Those who refused to eat corpses died. Those who refused to kill their fellow man died. Parents who resisted cannibalism died before their children did.

== Aftermath and legacy ==
Two thirds of the Kazakh survivors of the famine were successfully sedentarized due to the 80% reduction of their herds, the impossibility of resuming pastoral activity in the immediate post-famine environment, and the repatriation and resettlement program undertaken by Soviet authorities. Despite this, Niccolò Pianciola says that the Soviet campaign to destroy nomadism was quickly rejected after the famine, and that nomadism even experienced a resurgence during World War II after the transfer of livestock from Nazi-occupied territories.

Ibragim Khisamutdinov, who lived through the famine as a young boy, saw starving Kazakhs dying in the streets on his way to school. More than 50 years later, he noted, "To this day, I can hear the desperate cries of the dying and their calls for help."

A monument for the famine's victims was constructed in 2017. The Turkic Council has described the famine as a "criminal Stalinist ethnic policy". A genocide remembrance day is commenced on 31 May for the victims of the famine.

Soviet famine of 1932–1933 displaying migrations out of Kazakhstan and the high estimate of 2.3 million deaths. Other scholars estimate an amount of 1.5 million deaths.

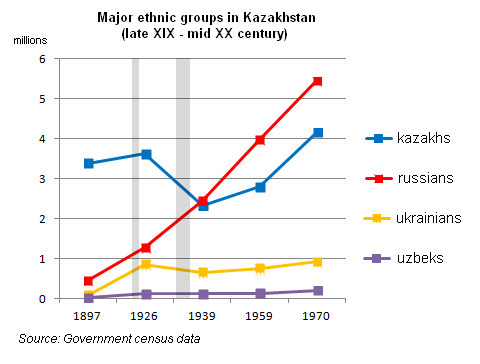
The major ethnic groups in Kazakhstan, 1897–1970. The number of Kazakhs and Ukrainians decreased in the 1930s due to the famine.

== Assessment, legality, and censorship ==
Like the Holodomor, there is heated debate as to whether or not the famine fits in with the legal definition of genocide, as defined by the UN. In November 1991, the Kazakhstan parliament created a committee, chaired by Historian Manash Kozybayev, to investigate the famine and its causes. A year later, the commission reported out that "the magnitude of the tragedy was so monstrous that we can, with full moral authority, designate it as a manifestation of the politics of genocide."

Europeans in Kazakhstan had disproportionate power in the party, which has been argued as a cause of why indigenous nomads suffered the worst part of the collectivization process rather than the European sections of the country. Notably, many scholars have compared the internal colonization of Kazakhs as similar to American policies towards Native Americans such as the Sioux, who were similarly nomads. Niccolò Pianciola argues that the Soviet authorities undertook a campaign of persecution against the nomads in the Kazakhs, believing that the destruction of the 'class' was a worthy sacrifice for the collectivization of Kazakhstan, and that from Lemkin's point of view on genocide all nomads of the Soviet Union were victims of the crime, not just the Kazakhs. However, other nomads within Soviet territory were also Indigenous Turkic or Mongolic Central and North Asian peoples, had similar treatment by the Soviet Union, and discrimination that continues to this day. Kazakhs and other Central Asians are still referred to in Russian sometimes as aziaty, or as churka or churki (Russian: чурка), a racial slur that means "darkie" or "block of wood".

A historian of the revolution and author Vladimir Burtsev, who knew Filipp Goloshchyokin, characterized him in his writing:

This is a typical Leninist. This is a man who does not stop the blood. This trait is especially noticeable in his nature: the executioner, cruel, with some elements of degeneration. In party life he was arrogant, was a demagogue, a cynic. He did not count the Kazakhs as people at all. Goloshchekin did not have time to appear in Kazakhstan, as he stated that there is no Soviet power, and it is "necessary" to orchestrate a "Small October".

Historian Stephen G. Wheatcroft believes that the high expectations of central planners were sufficient to demonstrate their ignorance of the ultimate consequences of their actions. Wheatcroft views the state's policies during the famine as "criminal acts of negligence", though not as intentional murder or genocide. However Historian Sarah Cameron, author of The Hungry Steppe: Famine, Violence, and the Making of Soviet Kazakhstan, stated in an interview with Harvard University's Davis Center that "Moscow's sweeping program of state-led transformation clearly anticipates the cultural disruption of Kazakh society. And there's evidence to indicate that the Kazakh famine fits an expanded definition of genocide." She also says:

"I think if we look historically, we can find that we've often been quick to dismiss violence committed against mobile peoples. We rationalize it as part of a process necessary to civilize so-called backward peoples.

When the Kazakh famine is mentioned in the scholarly literature, it's often referred to as a miscalculation by Stalin, a tragedy, a misunderstanding of cultures. But such depictions, I would argue, downplay the disaster's very violent nature, and seem to stress or imply that the Kazakh famine originated from natural causes, which of course it didn't.

I show in my book, there's nothing inevitable about this famine. Pastoral nomadism is not a backwards way of life, but rather it was a highly sophisticated and adaptive system. Nor can the famine itself be attributed to a simple miscalculation by Stalin as such depictions would seem to suggest."

Regarding the legal definition of genocide as determined by the UN, Michael Ellman states that it "seems to be an example of 'negligent genocide' which falls outside the scope of the UN Convention". Historian Isabelle Ohayon stated she found "no evidence nor motive for the deliberate starvation" of the Kazakh population, and concludes that the famine did not constitute a genocide under international juridical standards, and therefore labelling it was an "empty exercise". Maya Mehra concludes that the famine was caused by intentional act of violence on part of Stalin and the Soviet state, but it was not in the legal sense a genocide. In Red Famine: Stalin's War on Ukraine, Pulitzer Prize winner Anne Applebaum says that the UN definition of genocide is overly narrow due to the Soviet influence on the Genocide Convention, as extensively documented by scholars such as Anton Weiss-Wendt in his book The Soviet Union and the Gutting of the UN Genocide Convention. Instead of a broad definition that would have included Soviet crimes, Applebaum writes that genocide "came to mean the physical elimination of an entire ethnic group, in a manner similar to the Holocaust. The Holodomor does not meet that criterion ... This is hardly surprising, given that the Soviet Union itself helped shape the language precisely in order to prevent Soviet crimes, including the Holodomor, from being classified as 'genocide'."

Historian Robert Kindler disagrees with calling the famine a genocide, commenting that doing so masks the culpability of lower-level cadres who were locally rooted among the Kazakhs themselves. Kindler goes as far as to say that speaking in terms of genocide with the Holodomor and the famine eclipses "how the nations themselves were responsible for catastrophes" rather than the Soviet Union. However, Sarah Cameron stated that the Soviet decision to have Kazakhs serve as lower-level cadres was "a strategy purposefully designed to shatter old allegiances and sow violent conflict in the Kazakh Awul"

While serving as a Kluge Fellow at the Library of Congress for her research on the famine, Sarah Cameron identified the lack of a strong Kazakh diaspora as part of the reason why there's been no international recognition of the genocide:

In the West, the study of the Ukrainian famine has been supported by a very active Ukrainian diaspora community. They have endowed institutes across North America, and in the 1980s the Ukrainian famine was the subject of a US congressional investigation. There was no similar movement among the Kazakh diaspora–I'm not aware of a single Kazakh studies chair or Kazakh studies institute in the West. The Kazakh famine did not become incorporated into the US Cold War narrative about the Soviet Union.

In Famine, Memory, and Politics in the Post-Soviet Space: Contrasting Echoes of Collectivization in Ukraine and Kazakhstan, James Richter highlights:

The link between the genocide argument and the use of Kazakh language was made explicit by the historian Kaidar Aldazhumanov in an interview with Radio Azattyq in 2014. In this interview, Aldazhumanov suggests that foreign scholars and even Russian speakers at home do not regard the famine as genocide because "they cannot read witnesses or evidence in the Kazakh language and rely fundamentally on research in Russian.... They do not want to know anything about research in the Kazakh language, nor do Russian researchers or Russian speakers living in Kazakhstan"

Historian Isabelle Ohayon, among other scholars, noted the importance of oral histories in Kazakh culture, and wrote of disappearing famine accounts and lack of public narrative and awareness:

First, the bearers of the memory of this story—the witnesses, the actors, the victims of the famine—traversed the Soviet century in obscurity by virtue of the ideological ban on discussing this tragic chapter in the collectivization campaign, but also due to the hiatus generated by the powerful phenomenon of acculturation, or even deculturation, after the death of a third of the nomadic population. Because mortality was greater among the elderly during collectivization, the traditional bearers of collective memory were unable to tell their stories. Abruptly introduced into Soviet modernity--with its new forms of authority and its obsession with written records and bureaucracy--surviving elders no longer found conditions in which they could relate their experiences.

It is also important to note that Kazakhstan's government maintains close relations with Russia today, which contributes to its official documentation and statements on the famine as genocide. This connection is based on lasting Soviet ties, intimidation, and the dependence of Kazakhstan's economy on Russian imports, especially basic items such as food and clothing, and 40% of Kazakhstan's market needs are covered by Russia. As Anne Applebaum explains current denialism, "Putinism is an oligarchic autocracy that would be in trouble if there was complete freedom of speech, freedom of the press, and the rule of law." Only recently with the invasion of Ukraine in 2022 has there been notable disconnect between the allies.

Former President Nursultan Nazarbayev of Kazakhstan was noted as careful while speaking of the famine. However, an official inscription at the monument for the famine victims quoted him stating "the hunger that put an entire nation on the brink of disappearing, will never be forgotten", which lends credence to the common speculation that he was trying to appease Moscow in fear of retribution for recognizing the famine as genocide.

== Portrayals in media ==
- The Crying Steppe (2020), director Marina Kunarova, and selected as the Kazakhstani entry for the Best International Feature Film at the 93rd Academy Awards. The movie follows an eagle hunter trying to save his family.
- Qash (2023), director Aisultan Seitov. The movie follows a gravedigger facing a difficult choice during the famine.

== See also ==
- Bibliography of the Asharshylyk
- Ethnic demography of Kazakhstan
- History of Kazakhstan
- Kazakh famine of 1919-1922
- Droughts and famines in Russia and the Soviet Union
- Russian conquest of Central Asia
- Russian Empire
- Soviet famine of 1930–1933
- Excess mortality in the Soviet Union under Joseph Stalin
- Indigenous Peoples
- Genocide of indigenous peoples

== Bibliography ==
- Cameron, Sarah (2018). The Hungry Steppe: Famine, Violence, and the Making of Soviet Kazakhstan. Cornell University Press. ISBN 978-1-5017-3044-3.
- Conquest, Robert, The Harvest of Sorrow: Soviet Collectivization and the Terror-famine, Edmonton: The University of Alberta Press in Association with the Canadian Institute of Ukrainian Studies, 1986.
- Kindler, Robert (2018). Stalin's Nomads: Power and Famine in Kazakhstan. Pittsburgh: Pittsburgh University Press. ISBN 978-0-8229-8614-0.
- Ohayon, Isabelle (2006). La sédentarisation des Kazakhs dans l'URSS de Staline. Collectivization et changement social (1928–1945) (in French). Paris: Maisonneuve et Larose.
- Sahni, Kalpana. Crucifying the Orient: Russian orientalism and the colonization of Caucasus and Central Asia. Bangkok: White Orchid Press, 1997.
