= Kazakh famine of 1919–1922 =

1922 Famine in Kazakhstan

- Map of the Kirghiz ASSR and Turkestan ASSR, 1922
- Country: Soviet Union
- Location: Kirghiz ASSR and Turkestan ASSR
- Period: 1919–1922
- Total deaths: 400,000–2 million
- Causes: Droughts, failures of collectivization and Prodrazvyorstka
- Relief: Aid provided by the Workers International Relief, and American Relief Administration
- Effect on demographics: 19% to 33% of the Kazakh population died
- Preceded by: Russian famine of 1891–92
- Succeeded by: Kazakh famine of 1932–33

The Kazakh famine of 1919–1922, also referred to as the Turkestan famine of 1919–1922, was a period of mass starvation and drought that took place in the Kirghiz ASSR (present-day Kazakhstan) and Turkestan ASSR as a result of the Russian Civil War, in which 400,000 to 750,000 peasants died. The event was part of the greater Russian famine of 1921–22 that affected other parts of what became the Soviet Union, in which up to 5,000,000 people died in total.

== Background ==
The famine was caused by severe intermittent drought conditions, aggravated by the Russian Civil War and the policy of Prodrazvyorstka (grain requisitioning) adopted by the Soviet government.

== Famine ==
By 1919, roughly half of the population was starving. Epidemics of typhus and malaria were also widespread. The greatest percentage of losses of the Kazakh population was in Aqtobe, Akmola, Kostanay and Oral provinces. According to the estimates of demographers, about 19% of the population died, which is equivalent to 400,000 people. However, Turar Ryskulov, chairman of the Central Electoral Committee of the Turkestan Autonomous Soviet Socialist Republic, estimated that "about one third of the population must have died", which is equivalent to 750,000 people.

== Relief ==
The Soviet government invited international organizations such as Workers International Relief to provide relief and the American government provided aid to starving Kazakhs from 1920 to 1923 through the American Relief Administration. 1923 and 1924 were turning points in the restoration of the national economy and the hardest hitting phase of the famine ended in 1922. However, shortages, starvation, and illness continued throughout 1923 and into 1924.

== See also ==
- 1921–1922 famine in Tatarstan
- Kazakh famine of 1932–1933

== Sources ==
- Millar, James R. (2004). Encyclopedia of Russian History Volume 2: A-D. New York, USA: Macmillan Reference. ISBN 0-02-865907-4.
- Mizelle, Peter Christopher (May 2002). "Battle with Famine:" Soviet Relief and the Tatar Republic 1921–1922. District of Columbia, USA: University of Virginia.
