= Michael Ellman =

British economist and historian (born 1942)

Michael John Ellman (born 1942, United Kingdom) has been a professor of economics at the University of Amsterdam since 1978. He is now an emeritus professor. He has written on the economics of the Soviet Union, transition economics, Russia and comparative economic systems.

== Prizes and honours ==
- Foreign member (academician) of the Russian Academy of Economic Sciences and Entrepreneurship.
- Awarded the 1998 Kondratieff prize for his "contribution to the development of the social sciences" by the International N. D. Kondratieff Foundation.

== Selected works ==
- Planning Problems in the USSR: The contribution of mathematical methods to their solution (Cambridge: Cambridge University Press, 1973). ISBN 978-0521202497 (Italian edition 1979, Hungarian translation for internal official use 1970s, Russian translation for internal official use 1970s.)
- Socialist Planning (Cambridge: Cambridge University Press, 1st ed. 1979, 2nd ed. 1989, 3rd ed. 2014). ISBN 9781107427327
- "Did the agricultural surplus provide the resources for the increase in investment in the USSR during the First Five Year Plan?," Economic Journal (December 1975). (Russian translation Voprosy ekonomiki January 1992.)
- "Transformation, depression and economics: some lessons," Journal of Comparative Economics (August 1994). Reprinted in P.G.Hare & J.R.Davis (eds) Transition to the market economy (London: Routledge, 1997), vol.1.
- with V.Kontorovich (eds), The destruction of the Soviet economic system: an insiders' history (New York: M.E.Sharpe, 1998).
- "The 1947 Soviet famine and the entitlement approach to famines," Cambridge Journal of Economics (September 2000).
- (editor) Russia’s oil and natural gas: Bonanza or curse? (London: Anthem, 2006). ISBN 9781843312260

== Sources ==
- Homepage at the University of Amsterdam (Accessed August 2010)
- Michael Ellman, Policy Innovations: a publication of Carnegie Council.
