= Russian famine of 1891–1892 =

Imperial Russian famine and epidemic

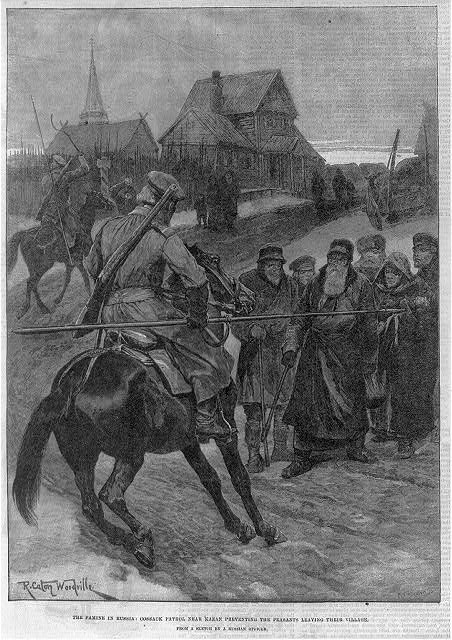
"Cossack patrol near Kazan preventing peasants from leaving their village". Engraving by R. Caton Woodville from sketches. The Illustrated London News, 1892.

The 1891–1892 famine in the Russian Empire, sometimes called the Tsar Famine, Tsar's Famine or Black Earth Famine, began along the Volga River and spread as far as the Urals and the Black Sea. This area included the provinces of Nizhni-Novgorod, Ryazan, Tula, Kazan, Simbirsk, Saratov, Penza, Samara and Tambov. The famine was initially caused by poor weather and was exacerbated by poor logistical networks, and a lack of grain reserves due to the Russian government's export policy.

According to some historians (disputed by other historians), the famine also resulted in mass outbreaks of disease. The logistical issues compounded relief efforts. The resulting death toll (as well as the question of whether there were any deaths caused by hunger) is a matter of debate among historians. Leo Tolstoy, who participated in helping peasants affected by crop failures, denied that there were any deaths from starvation. "If we define 'starvation' as a lack of food that leads to illness and death, as was recently reported in India, then there was no such starvation in 1891". Some historians estimate that death toll was around 375,000-400,000, mostly from the accompanying diseases. Other historians argue that the 1891 crop failure did not cause any human casualties, and the increase in mortality in Russia in 1892 was due to the cholera pandemic (which affected many countries) and had nothing to do with the 1891 crop failure: "Compared with the average annual mortality rate for the preceding three decades (1861-91), 1891 and 1893 actually had below-average mortality rates, although in 1892 European Russa did experience 260 010-250 100 more deaths than was 'normal'. However, now widely accepted that there about 300 000 cholera death in 1892 Russia, so it would appear that this cholera epidemic could account for all of the 'excess mortality'".

The Red Cross staff was unable to detect at least one death due to malnutrition, as well as there were no cases of suicide, cannibalism, etc. The reawakening of Russian Marxism and populism is often traced to the public's anger over the tsarist government's poor handling of the disaster.

== Weather ==
In 1891, a particularly-dry spring had delayed the planting of the fields. That winter, temperatures fell to −31 °C (−24 °F), but very little snow fell and the seedlings were totally unprotected from the frost. When the Volga River flooded, the lack of fire caused the water to freeze, which killed more seedlings and the fodder used to feed the horses. The seedlings that were not killed by frost were blown away along with the topsoil in an uncommonly-windy summer. The summer started as early as April and proved to be a long dry one. The city of Orenburg, for example, had no rain for over 100 days.

== Other causes ==
The opposition press has laid main blame at the government. The government was accused of refusing to use the word golod (голод) but called it a poor harvest, neurozhai (неурожай), and stopped the papers from reporting on it. The opposition also accused the government that grain exports were not banned until mid-August and merchants even had a month's warning and so they could quickly export their reserves. Minister of Finance Ivan Vyshnegradsky even opposed the late ban. The finance minister was also accused, of being responsible for the policy to raise consumer taxes to force peasants to sell more grain. A number of historians dispute these accusations, pointing out that the criticism from the revolutionary parties contains a lot of conscious and unconscious falsification of the facts regarding the situation of the peasantry, underestimates (or completely ignores) the government's assistance to the peasantry during the crop failure, and greatly exaggerates the consequences of the crop failure for the population. Historian Mikhail Davydov argues, in particular, that the idea of "hungry exports" as a reason for the peasants' lack of grain is a myth - grain exports came from provinces that did not experience crop failures in 1891, and exports had no impact on the peasants in the affected provinces. At the same time, Russia had sufficient grain reserves to prevent the consequences of the crop failure, and the problems were related to difficulties in timely delivery and distribution of grain to the affected provinces, and had nothing to do with exports.

== Relief efforts ==
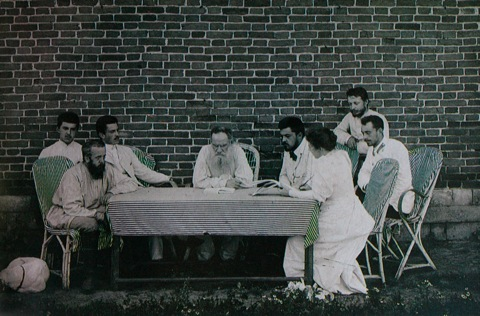
Leo Tolstoy organising famine relief in Samara, 1891

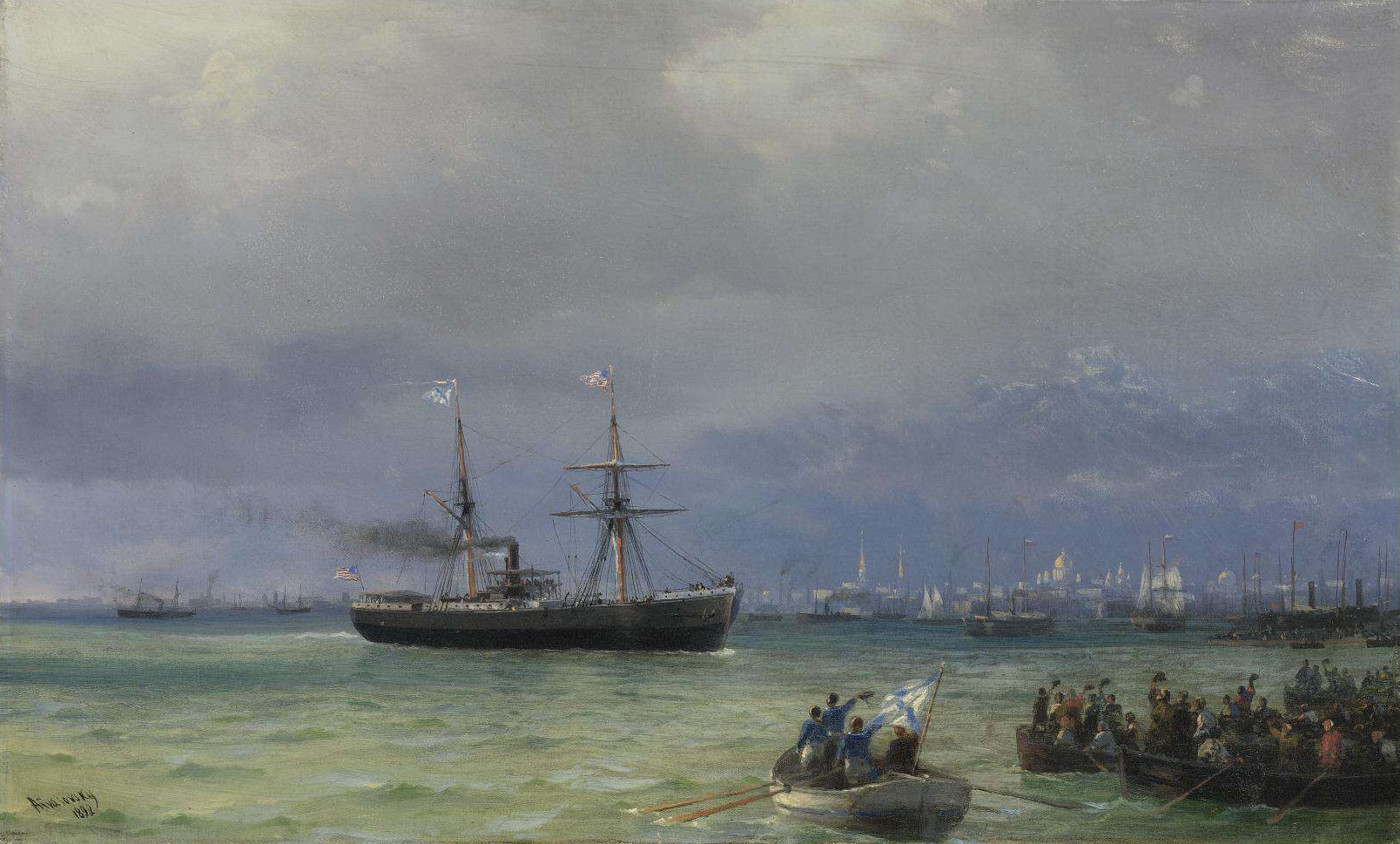
Ivan Aivazovsky: The Ship of Help, 1892

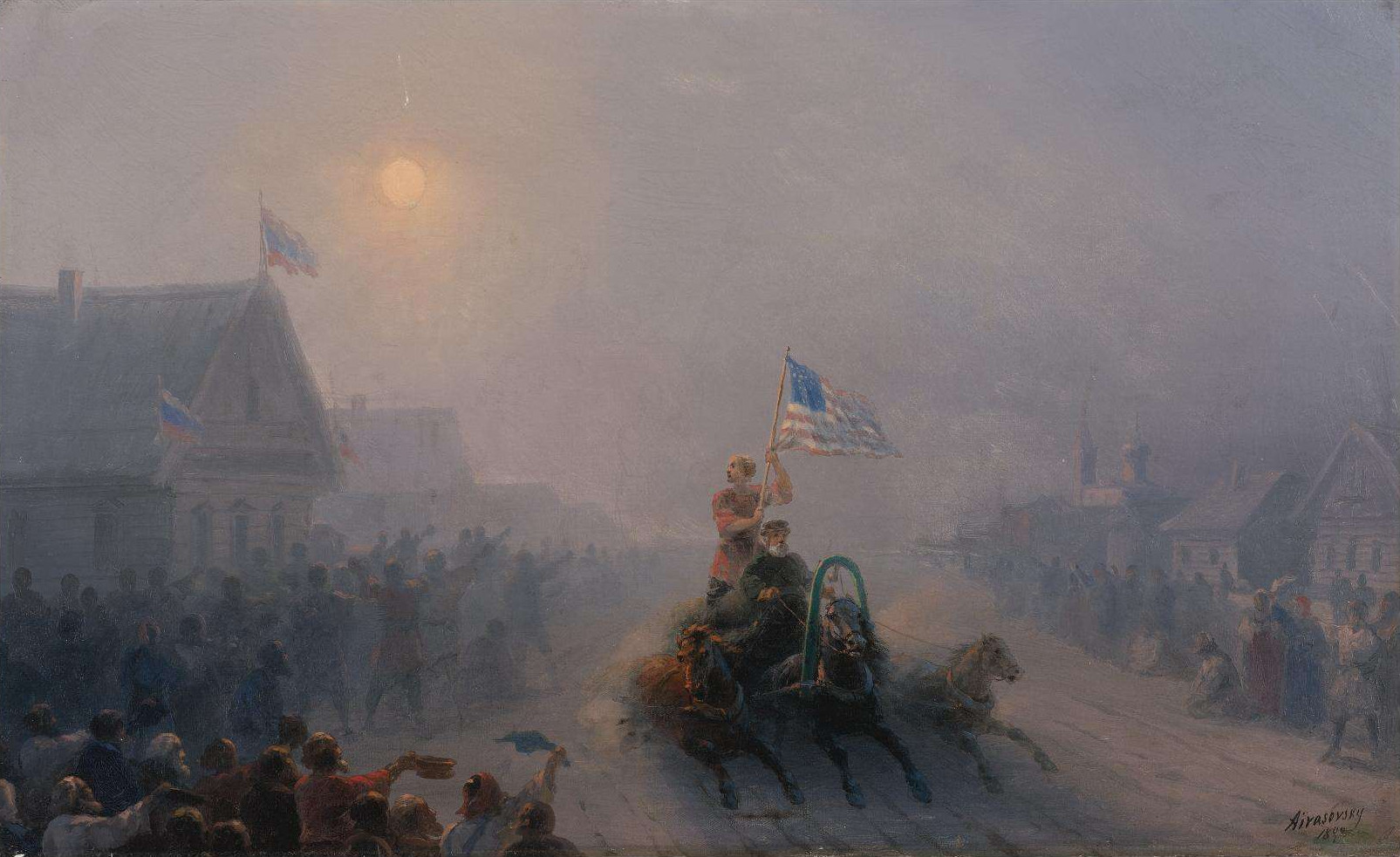
Ivan Aivazovsky: Food Distribution, 1892

The main factor in the fight against crop failure was the government subsidies of 172 million rubles (an amount comparable to the annual expenses on maintaining the army at that time), which were allocated to 27 affected provinces. Some of this aid was non-refundable, while others were provided in the form of loans, which led to fierce opposition criticism. However, almost all of the loans were later allowed to be forgiven, making most of the government aid non-refundable. On 17 November 1891, the government asked the people to form voluntary anti-famine organizations. Leo Tolstoy, the most famous volunteer, criticized the Tsar and the Russian Orthodox Church for handling of the famine. The future Tsar Nicholas II headed the relief committee and was a member of the finance committee three months later, and the Tsar and Tsarina raised 5 and 12 million rubles, respectively. Alexander III's sister-in-law Grand Duchess Elizabeth also raised money by selling peasant crafts in bazaars. Nicholas II said, "A great honor, but little satisfaction.... I must admit I never even suspected its [finance committee's] existence." The zemstvos got 150 million roubles from the government to buy food. In February 1892, the government bought 30,000 Kyrgyz horses so that the fields could be plowed.

The United States formed Russian Famine Relief Committee of the United States [Комитет США по оказанию помощи российским голодающим] and was headed by John Hoyt. The organization was mostly self-funded by donations. A "Famine Fleet" ["Флот Голода"] of the six steamships Indiana, Missouri, Borodina, Leo, Toledo and Connemaugh was assembled to transport agricultural products to Russia, with the first ship, the Indiana, arriving at Liepāja on 16 March 1892 with 1,900 tons of food. The second ship, Missouri, called at Liepaja on 4 April 1892 and delivered a further 2,500 tons of grain and corn flour. Another ship carrying humanitarian aid arrived in Riga in May, and additional ships followed in June and July. From late February to mid-July, the relief ships sailed to Russia averaging around 2,000 tons of food on board, mostly wheat and corn flour and grain. The total cost of the humanitarian aid provided by the United States in 1891–1892 was estimated to be around US$1 million (equivalent to $30 million in 2024).

Based on some American sources, the US government (through the Department of the Interior) provided financial assistance to certain Russian regions (guberniyas), mainly in the form of loans, in the amount of US$75 million (equivalent to $2.3 billion in 2024).

The events were pictured in 1892 by the famous Armenian-Russian painter Ivan Aivazovsky (Russian: Иван Айвазовский) who painted two pictures, "The Ship of Help" (Russian: Корабль помощи) and "Food Distribution" (Russian: Раздача продовольствия). In 2008, these paintings were sold by Sotheby's Auctions for $2.4 million.

== Economic consequences ==
Year	Export of grain (poods)	Balance of trade (Rubles)	Budget revenue (Rubles)	Budget expenditure (Rubles)	Budget balance (Rubles)
1890	418,503,000	+285,590,000	1,047,373,000	1,056,512,0	−9,139,000
1891	391,411,000	+335,804,000	928,795,000	1,115,647,000	−186,852,000
1892	196,422,000	+76,036,000	1,168,844,000	1,125,365,000	+43,488,000
1893	404,039,000	+149,601,000			

== See also ==
- Droughts and famines in Russia and the Soviet Union

== Sources ==
- Davidov, Michael (2023). Цена утопии: история российской модернизации [The Price of Utopia: The History of Russian Modernization]. Что такое Россия? (What is Russia?) (in Russian). Новое литературное обозрение. ISBN 978-5-4448-2136-7.
- Mulʹtatuli, Pyotr (2017). Россия в эпоху царствование Николая II [Russia in the reign of Nicholas II] (in Russian). Vol. 1. Moscow: Русский издательский центр имени святого Василия Великого. OCLC 1038064891.
