= The Black Book of Communism =

1997 book by Stéphane Courtois and others

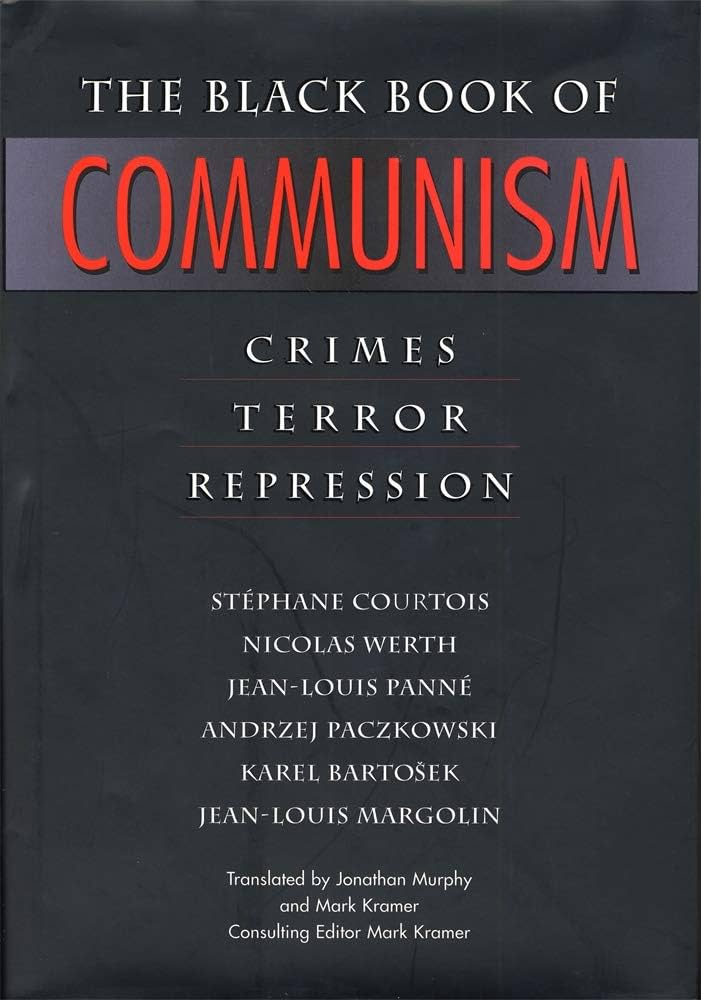
- Cover of the English edition
- Editor: Stéphane Courtois
- Authors: Karel Bartošek; Joachim Gauck*; Jean-Louis Margolin; Ehrhart Neubert*; Andrzej Paczkowski; Jean-Louis Panné; Nicolas Werth; (*German edition)
- Original title: Le Livre noir du communisme
- Language: French
- Subjects: Communist state; History of communism; Comparison of Nazism and Communism (Leninism, Maoism, Stalinism, etc.); Totalitarianism
- Publisher: Éditions Robert Laffont
- Publication date: 6 November 1997
- Publication place: France
- English publication date: 8 October 1999; Harvard University Press
- Media type: Print
- Pages: 912
- ISBN: 978-0674076082

The Black Book of Communism: Crimes, Terror, Repression is a 1997 (Note: The book was published in English in 1999) book by Stéphane Courtois, Nicolas Werth, Jean-Louis Panné, Andrzej Paczkowski, Karel Bartošek, Jean-Louis Margolin and several other European academics (Note: The full list of contributors include: Karel Bartošek (1930–2004), a historian from the Czech Republic and researcher at the Institut d'Histoire du Temps Présent (IHTP) in Paris.; Sylvain Boulouque, a research associate at GEODE, Université Paris X.; Stéphane Courtois, the director of research at the Centre national de la recherche scientifique and the main author and editor of the book.; Pascal Fontaine, a journalist with a special knowledge of Latin America.; Rémi Kauffer, a specialist in the history of intelligence, terrorism and clandestine operations.; Martin Malia, a historian and the author of the foreword to the English edition.; Jean-Louis Margolin, a lecturer at the Université de Provence and a researcher at the Research Institute on Southeast Asia.; Andrzej Paczkowski, the deputy director of the Institute for Political Studies of the Polish Academy of Sciences and a member of the archival commission for the Polish Ministry of Internal Affairs.; Jean-Louis Panné, a specialist on the international Communist movement.; Pierre Rigoulot, a political historian, human rights activist and researcher at the Institut d'Histoire Sociale (IHTP).; Yves Santamaria, a historian.; Nicolas Werth, a historian and researcher at the IHTP.) documenting a history of political repression by communist states, including genocides, extrajudicial executions, deportations, and deaths in labor camps and allegedly artificially created famines. The book was originally published in France as Le Livre noir du communisme: Crimes, terreur, répression by Éditions Robert Laffont. In the United States, it was published by Harvard University Press, with a foreword by Martin Malia. The German edition, published by Piper Verlag, includes a chapter written by Joachim Gauck. The introduction was written by Courtois. Historian François Furet was originally slated to write the introduction, but he died before he could.

The Black Book of Communism has been translated into numerous languages, has sold millions of copies, and is considered one of the most influential and controversial books written about the history of communism in the 20th century, in particular the history of the Soviet Union and other state socialist regimes. The work was praised by a broad range of popular-press publications and historians, while academic press and specialist reviews were more critical or mixed for some historical inaccuracies. The introduction by Courtois was especially criticized, including by three of the book's main contributors, for comparing communism to Nazism and giving a definitive number of "victims of communism", which critics have described as inflated. Werth's chapter, however, stood out as a positive. The book's title was chosen to echo The Black Book of Soviet Jewry, a documentary record of Nazi atrocities in the Eastern Front, written by Ilya Ehrenburg and Vasily Grossman for the Jewish Anti-Fascist Committee during World War II.

== Overview ==
The authors use the term communism to specifically mean Leninist and Marxist–Leninist forms of state-socialism, which was the dominant form of socialism during the 20th century following the October Revolution. It is distinguished from "small-c" communism, which has existed for millennia.

=== Introduction: "The Crimes of Communism" ===
The introduction, written by Courtois, was the main source of controversy, and was acknowledged by Martin Malia in his foreword. Courtois writes that "Communist regimes turned mass crime into a full-blown system of government" and are responsible for a greater number of deaths than Nazism or any other political system. Courtois says that "Communism, the defining characteristic of the 'short twentieth century' that began in Sarajevo in 1914 and ended in Moscow in 1991, finds itself at center stage in the story. Communism predated fascism and Nazism, outlived both, and left its mark on four continents." Courtois goes on to explain what is meant by the term Communism in the book. According to Courtois, "[w]e must make a distinction between the doctrine of communism and its practice. As a political philosophy, communism has existed for centuries, even millennia." Citing Plato's Republic and Thomas More as communist examples of what he terms utopian philosophy, Courtois states that "the Communism that concerns us does not exist in the transcendent sphere of ideas. This Communism is altogether real; it has existed at key moments of history and in particular countries, brought to life by its famous leaders", citing Fidel Castro, Jacques Duclos, Vladimir Lenin, Georges Marchais, Ho Chi Minh, Joseph Stalin, and Maurice Thorez as examples of the latter.

Courtois writes that "[r]egardless of the role that theoretical communist doctrines may have played in the practice of real Communism before 1917", it was what he terms "flesh-and-blood Communism" which "imposed wholesale repression, culminating in a state-sponsored reign of terror." Courtois then asks whether the ideology itself is "blameless", stating that "[t]here will always be some nitpickers who maintain that actual Communism has nothing in common with theoretical communism" and that "it would be absurd to claim that doctrines expounded prior to Jesus Christ, during the Renaissance, or even in the nineteenth century were responsible for the events that took place in the twentieth century." Quoting Ignazio Silone ("Revolutions, like trees, are recognized by the fruit they bear"), Courtois says that "[i]t was not without reason" that the Bolsheviks, whose party was called the Russian Social Democratic Labour Party, renamed it as the Russian Communist Party, called themselves "Communists", and erected monuments to honor Tommaso Campanella and Thomas More. Courtois claims that "the crimes of Communism have yet to receive a fair and just assessment from both historical and moral viewpoints."

=== Foreword: "The Uses of Atrocity" ===
In his foreword to the English-language and American edition, Malia states that "Communism has been the great story of the twentieth century" and "it had come to rule a third of mankind and seemed poised to advance indefinitely. For seven decades it haunted world politics, polarizing opinion between those who saw it as the socialist end of history and those who considered it history's most vital tyranny." According to Malia, "more than eighty years after 1917, probing examination of the Big Questions raised by the Marxist-Leninist phenomenon has hardly begun" and that "a serious historiography was precluded in Soviet Russia by the regime's mandatory ideology", further stating that "scholarly investigation of Communism has until recently fallen disproportionately to Westerns." Malia writes that "The Black Book offers us the first attempt to determine, overall, the actual magnitude of what occurred, by systematically detailing Leninism's 'crimes, terror, and repression' from Russia in 1917 to Afghanistan in 1989." Malia also argues against what he terms "the fable of 'good Lenin/bad Stalin'", stating that there never was a "benign, initial phase of Communism before some mystical 'wrong turn' threw it off track", claiming that Lenin expected and wanted from the start a civil war "to crush all 'class enemies'; and this war, principally against the peasants, continued with only short pauses until 1953." Malia further says that the Red Terror "cannot be explained as the prolongation of prerevolutionary political cultures", but rather as "a deliberate policy of the new revolutionary order; and its scope and inhumanity far exceeded anything in the national past." Malia laments that "'Positivist' social scientists ... have averred that moral questions are irrelevant to understanding the past" and criticizes this perspective by arguing that it "reduces politics and ideology everywhere to anthropology."

According to Malia, there is a "basic problem" in Western historiography of Communism which he describes as "the conceptual poverty of the Western empirical effort." Malia states that "[t]his poverty flows from the premise that Communism can be understood, in an aseptic and value-free mode, as the pure product of social process", faulting that "researches have endlessly insisted that the October Revolution was a workers' revolt and not a Party coup d'état, when it was obviously the latter riding piggyback on the former." According to Malia, "the central issue in Communist history is not the Party's ephemeral worker 'base'; it is what the intelligentsia victors of October later did with their permanent coup d'etat, and so far this has scarcely been explored." Malia then goes on to describe "two fantasies holding out the promise of a better Soviet socialism than the one the Bolsheviks actually built." The first one is "the 'Bukharin alternative' to Stalin" which Malia describes as "a thesis that purports to offer a nonviolent, market road to socialism—that is, Marx's integral socialism, which necessitates the full suppression of private property, profit, and the market." The second one "purports to find the impetus behind Stalin's 'revolution from above' of 1929–1933 in a 'cultural revolution' from below by Party activists and workers against the 'bourgeois' specialists dear to Bukharin, a revolution ultimately leading to massive upward mobility from the factory bench." Malia writes that "perhaps a moral, rather than a social, approach to the Communist phenomenon can yield a truer understanding for the much-investigated Soviet social process claimed victims on a scale that has never aroused a scholarly curiosity at all proportionate to the magnitude of the disaster."

=== Estimated number of victims ===
According to the introduction, the number of people killed by the Communist governments amounts to more than 94 million. The statistics of victims include deaths through executions, man-made hunger, famine, war, deportations, and forced labor. The breakdown of the number of deaths is given as follows:

- 65 million in the People's Republic of China
- 20 million in the Soviet Union
- 2 million in Cambodia
- 2 million in North Korea
- 1.7 million in Ethiopia
- 1.5 million in Afghanistan
- 1 million in the Eastern Bloc
- 1 million in Vietnam
- 150,000 in Latin America
- 10,000 deaths "resulting from actions of the international Communist movement and Communist parties not in power"

According to Courtois, the crimes by the Soviet Union included the following:

- The execution of tens of thousands of hostages and prisoners
- The murder of hundreds of thousands of rebellious workers and peasants from 1918 to 1922
- The Russian famine of 1921 which caused the death of 5 million people
- The decossackization, a policy of systematic repression against the Don Cossacks between 1917 and 1933
- The murder of tens of thousands in the Gulag during the period between 1918 and 1930
- The Great Purge which killed almost 690,000 people
- The dekulakization, resulting in the deportation of 2 million so-called kulaks from 1930 to 1932
- The death of 4 million Ukrainians (Holodomor) and 2 million others during the famine of 1932 and 1933
- The deportations of Poles, Ukrainians, Moldovans, and people from the Baltic states from 1939 to 1941 and from 1944 to 1945
- The deportation of the Volga Germans in 1941
- The deportation of the Crimean Tatars in 1944
- Operation Lentil and deportation of the Ingush in 1944

This and other communist death tolls have been criticized by various historians and scholars. Any attempt to estimate a total number of killings under communist regimes depends greatly on definitions, ranging from a low of 10–20 million to as high as 110 million. Criticism of some of the estimates is mostly focused on three aspects, namely that the estimates were based on sparse and incomplete data when significant errors are inevitable, that the figures were skewed to higher possible values, and that those dying at war and victims of civil wars, Holodomor, and other famines under Communist regimes should not be counted.

Historian Andrzej Paczkowski wrote that "[s]ome critics complained that Courtois was 'hunting' for the highest possible number of victims, which led him, as J. Arch Getty wrote in the Atlantic Monthly, to include 'every possible death just to run up the score.' To an extent, the charge is valid. Courtois and other contributors to the volume equate the people shot, hanged, or killed in prisons or the camps with those who were victims of calculated political famines (in the Chinese and Soviet cases), or who otherwise starved for lack of food or died for lack of drugs." Based on the results of their studies, Courtois estimated the total number of the victims at between 65 and 93 million, an unjustified and unclear sum according to Margolin and Werth. In particular, Margolin, who authored the book's chapter on Vietnam, stated that "he has never mentioned a million deaths in Vietnam"; Margolin likened Courtois's effort to "militant political activity, indeed, that of a prosecutor amassing charges in the service of a cause, that of a global condemnation of the Communist phenomenon as an essentially criminal phenomenon." Historians Jean-Jacques Becker and J. Arch Getty criticized Courtois for failing to draw a distinction between victims of neglect and famine and victims of "intentional murder." Regarding these questions, historian Alexander Dallin wrote that moral, legal, or political judgments hardly depend on the number of victims. Getty criticized Malia as a "specialist on the 19th century who has never done original research on the Soviet era."

In The Devil in History, political scientist Vladimir Tismăneanu wrote: "Speaking of the number of victims under communist regimes (between 85 and 100 million) and comparing this horrible figure to number of people who perished under or because of Nazism (25 million), Courtois decided to downplay a few crucial facts. In this respect, some of his critics were not wrong. First, as an expansionist global phenomenon, Communism lasted between 1917 and the time of the completion of The Black Book (think of North Korea, China, Cuba, Vietnam, where it is still alive, if not well). [Nazism] lasted between 1933 and 1945. Second, we simply do not know what the price in terms of victims of Nazism would have been had Hitler won the war. The logical hypothesis is that not only Jews and Gypsies but also millions of Slavs and other 'racially unfit' individuals would have been destined to death."

=== Comparison of communism and Nazism ===
On 12 November 1997, the then-Prime Minister of France and Socialist Lionel Jospin responded to the book's claims and declared to the National Assembly that "the Revolution of 1917 was one of the great events of the century. ... And if the [French Communist Party (PCF)] had taken so long to denounce Stalinism, it had done so anyway." Jospin added that "the PCF had learned the lessons from its history. It is represented in my government and I'm proud of it." In a 21 November 1997 interview with Die Zeit, Courtois stated: "In my opinion, there is nothing exceptional about the Nazi genocide against the Jews." Historian Amir Weiner wrote: "The comparison with Nazism is inevitable. It is merited on the grounds of the mutual commitment to social engineering through violent means; the ensuing demographic, psychological, and ethical implications; and, not least, the fact that both systems constantly scrutinized one another. Unfortunately, the authors of the Black Book reduce the comparison to body counting, charging communists with killing nearly 100 million people and the Nazis, 25 million. At best, this approach is ahistorical and demeaning."

Many observers have rejected Courtois' numerical and moral comparison of communism to Nazism in the introduction, the claim made in the book that "a lot of what they describe 'crimes, terror, and repression' has somehow been kept from the general public", According to Werth, there was still a qualitative difference between communism and Nazism, stating: "Death camps did not exist in the Soviet Union." On 21 September 2000, Werth further told Le Monde: "The more you compare Communism and Nazism, the more the differences are obvious." Weiner wrote that "[w]hen Stalin's successors opened the gates of the Gulag, they allowed 3 million inmates to return home. When the Allies liberated the Nazi death camps, they found thousands of human skeletons barely alive awaiting what they knew to be inevitable execution." Historian Ronald Grigor Suny remarked that Courtois' comparison of 100 million victims of Communism to 25 million victims of Nazism leaves out "most of the 40–60,000,000 lives lost in the Second World War, for which arguably Hitler and not Stalin was principally responsible." Alongside philosopher Scott Sehon, anthropologist and postsocialist gender studies scholar Kristen Ghodsee commented that Courtois' death toll estimate for Nazism "conveniently" excludes those killed in World War II.

At least one scholar in Le Monde denounced the introduction, the main source of controversy, as antisemitic, and other critics also denounced it as antisemitic, a charge Malia disagreed with. In the Nature, Society, and Thought academic journal, Marxist philosopher Robert Steigerwald wrote: "The book's main thesis reads thus: our century's fundamental crime was not the Holocaust, but rather the existence of Communism. Through the manipulation of numbers—only twenty-five million human lives fell victim to Hitler, one hundred million to Communism worldwide—the impression is created that Communism is four times worse than fascism and that the Holocaust was not a uniquely evil crime."

Jacques Sémelin writes that Courtois and Margolin "view class genocide as the equivalent to racial genocide." Alongside Michael Mann, they contributed to "the debates on comparisons between Nazism and communism", with Sémelin describing this as a theory also developed in The Black Book of Communism. Margolin, along with Werth, addressed this comparison in a response printed in Le Monde; rather than "indistinguishable evils", they emphasized a marked distinction in ideology. Courtois responded in the same newspaper with an essay in 1997. Werth compared the idea to ascribe all crimes committed by Communist states to communism with the idea to "throw in the face of a liberal the crimes committed in all the countries that claimed to be liberal." According to historian Andrzej Paczkowski, only Courtois made the comparison between Communism and Nazism, while the other sections of the book "are, in effect, narrowly focused monographs, which do not pretend to offer overarching explanations." Paczkowski wonders whether it can be applied "the same standard of judgment to, on the one hand, an ideology that was destructive at its core, that openly planned genocide, and that had an agenda of aggression against all neighboring (and not just neighboring) states, and, on the other hand, an ideology that seemed clearly the opposite, that was based on the secular desire of humanity to achieve equality and social justice, and that promised a great leap of forward into freedom", and states that while a good question, it is inappropriate and hardly new because The Black Book of Communism is not "about communism as an ideology or even about communism as a state-building phenomenon."

In a 2001 article for Human Rights Review, Vladimir Tismăneanu stated that while "[a]nalytical distinctions between them are certainly important, and sometimes Courtois does not emphasize them sufficiently", their "commonality in terms of complete contempt for the bourgeois state of law, human rights, and the universality of humankind regardless of spurious race and class distinctions is in my view beyond doubt." Tismăneanu said that in making this comparison, Courtois was drawing on Vasily Grossman's earlier explorations of the same theme in Life and Fate and Forever Flowing. In 2012, Tismăneanu wrote that "in the case of communism one can identify an inner dynamic that could and did in fact contrast the original promises to the sordidly criminal practices. In other words, there was a possible search for reforms, and even for socialism with a human face, within the communist world, but such a thing would have been unthinkable under Nazism. The chasm between theory and practice, or at least between the moral-humanist Marxian (or socialist) creed, and the Leninist, Stalinist (or Maoist, or Khmer Rouge) experiments was more than an intellectual fantasy."

==== Stéphane Courtois ====
Courtois considers Communism and Nazism to be distinct yet comparable totalitarian systems, stating that Communist regimes have killed "approximately 100 million people in contrast to the approximately 25 million victims of the Nazis." Courtois claims that Nazi Germany's methods of mass extermination were adopted from Soviet methods. As an example, Courtois cites the Nazi SS official Rudolf Höss who organized the infamous extermination camp, Auschwitz concentration camp, writing: "The Reich Security Head Office issued to the commandants a full collection of reports concerning the Russian concentration camps. These described in great detail the conditions in, and organization of, the Russian camps, as supplied by former prisoners who had managed to escape. Great emphasis was placed on the fact that the Russians, by their massive employment of forced labor, had destroyed whole peoples." His remarks and comparisons were deemed by critics to be antisemitic. A report by the Wiesel Commission criticized the comparison of Gulag victims with Jewish Holocaust victims as an attempt at Holocaust trivialization. Courtois defended himself from the charges by citing the Russian-Jewish writer Vasily Grossman, who compared the deaths of kulaks' children to those of Jewish children who were put in the gas chambers.

Courtois states that the Soviet crimes against peoples living in the Caucasus and of large social groups in the Soviet Union could be called genocide and were not very much different from similar policies by the Nazi Party. For Courtois, both Communist and Nazi systems deemed "a part of humanity unworthy of existence. The difference is that the Communist model is based on the class system, the Nazi model on race and territory." Courtois writes: "Here, the genocide of a 'class' may well be tantamount to the genocide of a "race"—the deliberate starvation of a child of a Ukrainian kulak as a result of the famine caused by Stalin's regime 'is equal to' the starvation of a Jewish child in the Warsaw Ghetto as a result of the famine caused by the Nazi regime. According to Courtois, "the intransigent facts demonstrate that Communist regimes have victimized approximately 100 million people in contrast to the approximately 25 million of the Nazis." Courtois further says that "the Jewish genocide became a byword for modern barbarism, the epitome of twentieth-century mass terror. ... More recently, a single-minded focus on the Jewish genocide in an attempt to characterize the Holocaust as a unique atrocity has also prevented the assessment of other episodes of comparable magnitude in the Communist world. After all, it seems scarcely plausible that the victors who had helped bring about the destruction of a genocidal apparatus might themselves have put the very same methods into practice. When faced with this paradox, people generally preferred to bury their heads in sand."

==== Martin Malia ====
Malia strongly agrees with Courtois, describing it as "a 'tragedy of planetary dimensions' ..., with a grand total of victims variously estimated by contributors to the volume at between 85 million and 100 million" and stating that what he terms the "full power of the shock" was "delivered by the unavoidable comparison of this sum with that for Nazism, which at an estimated 25 million turns out to be distinctly less murderous than Communism." According to Malia, "[t]he shocking dimensions of the Communist tragedy" are "hardly news to any serious student of twentieth-century history, at least when the different Leninist regimes are taken individually."

Malia mentions Courtois' argument that since Nuremberg jurisprudence (Nuremberg Trials) is incorporated into French law, the "class genocide" of Communism can be equated with the "race genocide" of Nazism and categorized as a crime against humanity. He states that Courtois raised the point of how Western intellectuals, Communist sympathizers and apologists for Communist leaders were complicit in Communist crimes, and that they only rejected them "discreetly and in silence." According to Malia, the French right has been tainted by its association with the Nazi Vichy regime, whereas "'knowing the truth about the U.S.S.R.' has never been an academic matter" until the time the book was published. Malia then cites the example of the Socialist prime minister Lionel Jospin, who was in need of Communist votes to gain a parliamentary majority. While the non-Gaullist right cited the book to attack the Jospin government "for harboring allies with an unrepented 'criminal past'", the Gaullists "remained awkwardly in place."

Malia writes that the "ultimate distinguishing characteristic" of Nazism is the Holocaust which, according to Malia, is considered as historically unique. He laments that "Hitler and Nazism are now a constant presence in Western print and on Western television", while "Stalin and Communism materialize only sporadically", with the status of former Communists carrying no stigma. Malia also laments a double standard in de-Nazification and de-Stalinization, citing former Austrian president Kurt Waldheim, who "was ostracized worldwide once his Nazi past was uncovered", while the same treatment was not applied to Communists, with Communist monuments still standing in the former Communist states.

Malia cites the liberal Le Monde as arguing that "it is illegitimate to speak of a single Communist movement from Phnom Penh to Paris. Rather, the rampage of the Khmer Rouge is like the ethnic massacres of third-world Rwanda, or the 'rural' Communism of Asia is radically different from the 'urban' Communism of Europe; or Asian Communism is really only anticolonial nationalism", further stating that "conflating sociologically diverse movements" is "merely a stratagem to obtain a higher body count against Communism, and thus against all the left." He criticizes this as "Eurocentric condescension." Malia cites the conservative Le Figaro, summarizing its response as "spurning reductionist sociology as a device to exculpate Communism", that "Marxist-Leninist regimes are cast in the same ideological and organizational mold throughout the world", and that "this pertinent point also had its admonitory subtext: that socialists of whatever stripe cannot be trusted to resist their ever-present demons on the far left (those popular fronts were no accident after all)."

Malia writes that by reducing politics and ideology to anthropology, it "assure[s] us that contrary to Hannah Arendt, the 'Nazi/Soviet similarities' are insufficient to make denunciation a specifically 'totalitarian' phenomenon." He criticizes this argument by stating that "the difference between Nazi/Communist systems and Western ones is 'not qualitative but quantitative.' By implication, therefore, singling out Communist and Nazi terror in order to equate them becomes Cold War slander—the ideological subtext, as it happens, of twenty-five years of 'revisionist,' social-reductionist Sovietology." He further criticizes it by making the point that "this fact-for-fact's sake approach suggests that there is nothing specifically Communist about Communist terror—and, it would seem, nothing particularly Nazi about Nazi terror either." He states that "the bloody Soviet experiment is banalized in one great gray anthropological blur; and the Soviet Union is transmogrified into just another country in just another age, neither more nor less evil than any other regime going", and dismisses this as "obviously nonsense." For Malia, "the problem of moral judgment" is "inseparable from any real understanding of the past" and "from being human."

==== Moral equivalence ====
Malia asks "What of the moral equivalence of Communism and Nazism?" Malia writes that "[a]fter fifty years of debate, it is clear that no matter what the hard facts are, degrees of totalitarian evil will be measured as much in terms of present politics as in terms of past realities" and that "we will always encounter a double standard as long as there exist a left and a right", which he "roughly define[s] as the priority of compassionate egalitarianism for the one, and as the primacy of prudential order for the other." Malia states that "[s]ince neither principle can be applied absolutely without destroying society, the modern world lives in perpetual tension between the irresistible pressure for equality and the functional necessity of hierarchy." For Malia, it is "this syndrome" which "gives the permanent qualitative advantage to Communism over Nazism in any evaluation of their quantitative atrocities. For the Communist projects, in origin, claimed commitment to universalistic and egalitarian goals, whereas the Nazi projects offered only unabashed national egoism", causing their practices to be "comparable" and their "moral auras" to be "antithetical."

According to this argument, "[a] moral man can have 'no enemies to the left,' a perspective in which undue insistence on Communist crime only 'plays into the hands of the right'—if, indeed, any anticommunism is not simply a mask for antiliberalism." Malia cites Le Monde as deeming The Black Book of Communism "inopportune because equating Communism with Nazism removed the 'last barriers to legitimating the extreme right,' that is, Le Pen." While stating it is true that "Le Pen's party and similar hate-mongering, xenophobic movements elsewhere in Europe represents an alarming new phenomenon that properly concerns all liberal democrats", Malia writes that in no way does it follow that "Communism's criminal past should be ignored or minimized." Malia writes that "the persistence of such sophistry is precisely why The Black Book is so opportune", much like Courtois' reasoning for writing the book that "the crimes of Communism have yet to receive a fair and just assessment from both historical and moral viewpoints."

About The Black Book of Communism, Courtois further says: "This book is one of the first attempts to study Communism with a focus on its criminal dimensions, in both the central regions of Communist rule and the farthest reaches of the globe. Some will say that most of these crimes were actions conducted in accordance with a system of law that was enforced by the regimes' official institutions, which were recognized internationally and whose heads of state continued to be welcomed with open arms. But was this not the case with Nazism as well? The crimes we shall expose are to be judged not by the standards of Communist regimes, but by the unwritten code of natural laws of humanity." Courtois states that "[t]he legal ramification of crimes committed by a specific country were first confronted in 1945 at the Nuremberg Tribunal, which was organized by the Allies to consider the atrocities committed by the Nazis." Courtois writes that "[a]n examination of all the crimes committed by the Leninist/Stalinist regime, and in the Communist world as a whole, reveals crimes that fit into each of these three categories", namely crimes against humanity, crimes against peace, and war crimes.

=== German edition: "The Processing of Socialism in the GDR" ===
The German edition contains an additional chapter on the Soviet-backed Communist regime in East Germany titled "Die Aufarbeitung des Sozialismus in der DDR" ("The Processing of Socialism in the GDR"). It consists of two subchapters, namely "Politische Verbrechen in der DDR" ("Political Crimes in the GDR") by Ehrhart Neubert and "Vom schwierigen Umgang mit der Wahrnehmung" ("On the Difficulty of Handling Perceptions") by Joachim Gauck.

== Reception ==
According to historian Jon Wiener, The Black Book of Communism "received both praise and criticism. ... The book was especially controversial in France because it was published during the 1997 trial of Nazi collaborator Maurice Papon for crimes against humanity for his role in the deportation of Jews from Bordeaux to Hitler's death camps. Papon's lawyers introduced the book as evidence for the defense." The Black Book of Communism has been especially influential in Eastern Europe, where it was uncritically embraced by prominent politicians and intellectuals—many of these intellectuals popularized it using terminology and concepts popular with the radical right.

According to political scientist Stanley Hoffmann, "[t]his gigantic volume, the sum of works of 11 historians, social scientists, and journalists, is less important for the content, but for the social storm it has provoked in France. ... What Werth and some of his colleagues object to is 'the manipulation of the figures of the numbers of people killed' (Courtois talks of almost 100 million, including 65 million in China); 'the use of shock formulas, the juxtaposition of histories aimed at asserting the comparability and, next, the identities of fascism, and Nazism, and communism.' Indeed, Courtois would have been far more effective if he had shown more restraint."

=== Academic press ===
Whereas chapters of the book that describe the events in separate Communist states were praised for the most part, some generalizations made by Courtois in the introduction to the book became a subject of criticism both on scholarly and political grounds. Moreover, three of the book's main contributors (Karel Bartosek, Jean-Louis Margolin, and Nicolas Werth) publicly disassociated themselves from Courtois's statements in the introduction and criticized his editorial conduct. Margolin and Werth felt that Courtois was "obsessed" with arriving at a total of 100 million killed, which resulted in "sloppy and biased scholarship", faulted him for exaggerating death tolls in specific countries, and rejected the comparison between Communism and Nazism. (Note: Aronson wrote: "But most of these problems pale in significance compared with the book's opening and closing chapters, which caused enormous controversy and even occasioned a break among The Black Book's authors. ... Courtois's figures for the Soviet Union, Vietnam, and Latin America go far beyond the estimates of the authors themselves, as does Courtois's final body count. ... But two other theses created considerable consternation and have come to be associated with The Black Book: the figure of 100 million deaths and the parallel with Nazism. They became central in the debate that followed. ... In articles and interviews Werth and Margolin pointed out how, in the service of this goal, Courtois distorted and exaggerated: Werth's total, including the Civil War and the famine of 1932–1933 had been five million less than Courtois's 'mythical number,' while Margolin denied having spoken of the Vietnamese Communists being responsible for one million deaths. Interviewed in Le Monde, Margolin likened Courtois's effort to 'militant political activity, indeed, that of a prosecutor amassing charges in the service of a cause, that of a global condemnation of the Communist phenomenon as an essentially criminal phenomenon.' Both rejected the comparison between Communism and Nazism: ... .")

Several reviewers have singled out Werth's "State against Its People" as being the most notable and best researched contribution in the book. Historian Ronald Aronson stated that "[Werth] is concerned, fortunately, neither to minimize nor to maximize numbers, but to accurately determine what happened." Historian Peter Kenez criticized the chapter written by Werth, arguing that "Werth can also be an extremely careless historian. He gives the number of Bolsheviks in October 1917 as 2,000, which is a ridiculous underestimate. He quotes from a letter of Lenin to Alexander Shliapnikov and gives the date as 17 October 1917; the letter could hardly have originated at that time, since in it Lenin talks about the need to defeat the Tsarist government, and turn the war into a civil conflict. He gives credit to the Austro-Hungarian rather than the German army for the conquest of Poland in 1915. He describes the Provisional Government as 'elected'. He incorrectly writes that the peasant rebels during the civil war did more harm to the Reds than to the Whites, and so on." Historian Michael Ellman stated that the book's estimate of "at least 500,000" deaths during the Soviet famine of 1946–1947 "is formulated in an extremely conservative way, since the actual number of victims was much larger", with 1,000,000–1,500,000 excess deaths. Historians such as Hiroaki Kuromiya and Mark Tauger challenged the authors' thesis that the famine of 1933 was largely artificial and genocidal.

Historian Alexander Dallin questioned "[w]hether all these cases, from Hungary to Afghanistan, have a single essence and thus deserve to be lumped together—just because they are labeled Marxist or communist—is a question the authors scarcely discuss." Historians Jens Mecklenburg and Wolfgang Wippermann wrote that a connection between the events in Pol Pot's Cambodia and Joseph Stalin's Soviet Union are far from evident and that Pol Pot's study of Marxism in Paris is insufficient for connecting radical Soviet industrialism and the Khmer Rouge's murderous anti-urbanism under the same category. Historian Michael David-Fox criticized the figures as well as the idea to combine loosely connected events under a single category of Communist death toll, blaming Courtois for their manipulation and deliberate inflation which are presented to advocate the idea that Communism was a greater evil than Nazism. In particular, David-Fox criticized the idea to connect the deaths with some "generic Communism" concept, defined down to the common denominator of party movements founded by intellectuals. David-Fox also described "Malia's comparison and rhetorical equation of erstwhile social-history revisionists in the Soviet field with David Irving and other Holocaust deniers" as "a quintessentially ideological move."

Historian Tony Judt wrote that "[t]he myth of the well-intentioned founders—the good czar Lenin betrayed by his evil heirs—has been laid to rest for good. No one will any longer be able to claim ignorance or uncertainty about the criminal nature of Communism." In History: Reviews of New Books, Jack M. Lauber compared its impact to that of Aleksandr Solzhenitsyn's The Gulag Archipelago. Political scientist Vladimir Tismăneanu, whose work focuses on Eastern Europe, stated that "the Black Book of Communism succeeds in demonstrating ... that Communism in its Leninist version (and, one must recognize, this has been the only successful application of the original dogma) was from the very outset inimical to the values of individual rights and human freedom." In Russian History, the journal of the Institute of History of the Russian Academy of Sciences, Jennifer Wynot wrote: "The Black Book of Communism stands out as a significant work that should be required reading for all modern historians. Each essay stands alone as an important scholarly contribution. At the same time, the essays hang together well. It is interesting also that all of the writers have political roots in European left."

Historian Jolanta Pekacz said that the "archival revelations of The Black Book collapse the myth of a benign, initial phase of communism before it was diverted from the right path by circumstances." Political scientist Robert Legvold summarized the authors as charging that Communism was a criminal system, while others such as Werth gave more nuanced views, and stated that "despite Courtois' brave attempt in the conclusion, however, the authors fail to answer their own central question: Why did communism, when in power, start and stay so murderous?" Historian Andrzej Paczkowski cited the numerous critiques, including it being called "a crudely anticommunist, anti-Semitic work", and agreed that "excessive moralizing makes objective analysis of the past difficult—and perhaps impossible", and the book has weaknesses but wrote that it has had two positive effects, among them stirring a debate about the implementation of totalitarian ideologies and "an exhaustive balance sheet about one aspect of the worldwide phenomenon of communism." According to honorary professor David J. Galloway, "The Black Book provides an excellent survey of scholarship on the Soviet system and the systems of other communist states", and said that this emphasis is valuable.

=== Popular press ===
The Black Book of Communism received praise in many publications in the United Kingdom and the United States, including the East Valley Tribune, Evening Standard, Foreign Affairs, Insight on the News, Kirkus Reviews, Library Journal, The New Republic, The New York Times, The New York Times Book Review, National Review, Orlando Sentinel, Publishers Weekly, Salon, The Saturday Evening Post, The Times Literary Supplement, The Tribune, The Wall Street Journal, The Washington Post Book World, The Washington Times, and The Weekly Standard. Philosopher Alan Ryan wrote that "[t]o the extent that the book has a literary style, it is that of the recording angel; this is the body count of a colossal, wholly failed social, economic, political and psychological experiment. It is a criminal indictment, and it rightly reads like one." Ryan stated that the authors do not astonish their readers, "dramatize the sufferings of the victims of Communism", or focus on quarrels over exact numbers of victims, affirming that there is no serious moral difference between the lower and higher estimated numbers. Speaking of the relative immorality of Communism and Nazism, Ryan said that the "body count tips the scales against Communism", but that if the "intrinsic evil of the entire project" is considered, Nazism is still worse because it was exterminationist.

Noam Chomsky criticized the book as one-sided, and compared it to research on hunger in India and China by economists Amartya Sen and Jean Drèze. Chomsky said that the Great Chinese Famine, which at an estimated 25-40 million deaths accounts for a large proportion of the total deaths due to communism, was a "terrible atrocity" that "fully merits the harsh condemnation it has received", but said that if we were to apply the Black Book methodology to India, we would conclude that capitalism, in India, has caused more deaths than in the entire history of communism worldwide: "over 100 million deaths [from 1947 to] 1979, and tens of millions more since, in India alone." Chomsky cited Sen and Drèze's research, which states that although India's democratic institutions prevented famines (experiencing none since independence), its excess of mortality over China in non-famine years was nonetheless close to 4 million per year, as a result of China placing greater emphasis on an equal distribution of medical resources and public distribution of food. Chomsky quoted their 1989 book Hunger and Public Action, which states that "despite the gigantic size of excess mortality in the Chinese famine, the extra mortality in India from regular deprivation in normal times vastly overshadows the former [...] This implies that every eight years or so more people die in India because of its higher regular death rate than died in China in the gigantic famine of 1958–1961. India seems to manage to fill its cupboard with more skeletons every eight years than China put there in its years of shame." Chomsky further criticized that the book overlooks the economic depression and resulting mortality crisis that Russia suffered in the 1990s during its transition to capitalism. He said that by ignoring the crimes committed by the Western Bloc during the Cold War, the book promotes a simplistic good-versus-evil narrative in which the atrocities committed by "our side" are justified in order to defeat the "ultimate evil".

Historian Jacques Julliard and philosopher Jean-François Revel defended the book. According to journalist Gilles Perrault, the book ignores the effect of international factors, including military interventions, invasions, sanctions, and coups, on the Communist experience.

== Legacy ==
Reflecting on The Black Book of Communism in the Human Rights Review, sociologist John Torpey wrote: "In view of The Black Book's relatively scanty scholarly contribution, it is hard to read the book in other than political terms. In this regard, The Black Book may be seen as an effort to legitimize the claims to memorialization and reparations of those who suffered under Communism. Such claims have become high stakes in an era that frequently rewards those who can demonstrate that they, too, have been victimized in the past." In a 2001 article for The Journal of American History, professor of history Shane J. Maddock wrote: "Since its publication in France in 1997, The Black Book of Communism has played a dual role, both chronicling the crimes of various Communist regimes and also serving as a text that reveals the shifting status of Marxism in the aftermath of the Cold War. Much of the controversy that has surrounded the book has focused on Stephane Courtois's introduction, in which he argues that communism represents a greater evil than Nazism, largely based on Marxism-Leninism's heftier death tally." In The Criminalisation of Communism in the European Political Space after the Cold War (2018), political scientist Laure Neumayer states that the book has played a major role in what she terms the criminalization of Communism in the European political space in the post Cold War-era. According to Neumayer, "by making criminality the very essence of communism, by explicitly equating the 'race genocide' of Nazism with the 'class genocide' of Communism in connection with the Ukrainian Great Famine of 1932–1933, the Black Book of Communism contributed to legitimising the equivalence of Nazi and Communist crimes. The book figures prominently in the 'spaces of the anti-communist cause' comparably structured in the former satellite countries, which are a major source of the discourse criminalising the Socialist period."

In a 2005 International History Review article, historian Donald Reid states that The Black Book of Communism opened the way to a new anti-communism, quoting fellow historian Marc Lazar as saying that "just as the intense relationship of the French with their national history created the conditions for the Vichy syndrome, their intense relationship with the Communist project could have similar consequences for the national psyche", and that Courtois, Lazar's former collaborator, believes French intellectuals have never "done their mourning of revolutionary ideology and of Leninism." A 2019 review for The American Historical Review about The Cambridge History of Communism said: "Unlike the cardboard cutouts of Communist leadership presented in ideologically charged studies like The Black Book of Communism: Crimes, Terror, Repression (1997), these essays are both nuanced and balanced, presenting Lenin and Stalin as human leaders driven as much by realpolitik and personal histories and events as by Communist ideology." In a 2019 Africa Check article, Naphtali Khumalo said that the 100 million estimate from The Black Book of Communism "is still up for debate by historians, political scientists and economists. It's not an easy claim to fact-check, and is ultimately a matter of opinion." In 2020, political scientist Valentin Behr et al. wrote that "the book was a turning point in the emergence of a consensual historical narrative across the former East-West divide as it enabled the formation of a revamped pan-European anti-communist movement." In a 2021 editorial in the eco-socialist journal Capitalism Nature Socialism, Salvatore Engel-Di Mauro et al. describe The Black Book of Communism as

"a 1997 propaganda volume that suits a more recent China-bashing campaign, where the Communist Party of China is purposefully conflated with communism. Just like anarchism should not be confused with chaos and terrorism, communism should not be confused, like those on the Right do, with the state socialist regimes, which are to be rigorously critiqued but should nonetheless be considered part of it, rather than denying any family resemblances with communism, like some on the Left do."

According to Engel-Di Mauro et al., the 100 million estimate popularized by The Black Book of Communism is used as an anti-communist trope to dismiss any criticism of capitalism and support for socialism.

== Sequels ==
As an Anti-Communist book, The Black Book of Communism was followed by the publication in 2002 of a series entitled Du passé faisons table rase! Histoire et mémoire du communisme en Europe with the same imprint. The first edition included the subtitle "The Black Book of Communism has not said everything." Like the first effort, this second work was edited by Courtois. The book focused on the history of Communism in Eastern Europe. Several translations of the book were marketed as the second volume of The Black Book of Communism, titled Das Schwarzbuch of Kommunismus 2. Das schwere Erbe der Ideologie, Chernata kniga na komunizma 2. chast, and Il libro nero del comunismo europeo.

Le Siècle des communismes, a collective work of twenty academics, was a response to both François Furet's Le passé d'une Illusion and The Black Book of Communism. It broke communism down into series of discrete movements, with mixed positive and negative results. The Black Book of Communism prompted the publication of several other "black books" which argued that similar chronicles of violence and death tolls can be constructed from an examination of capitalism and colonialism.

In 2007, Courtois edited Éditions Larousse's Dictionnaire du communisme. In 2008, Courtois took part to the writing of The Black Book of the French Revolution, a similar work of historical revisionism which proved to be controversial like The Black Book of Communism and received mostly negative reviews from both the press and historians. Courtois went back to its proposed link between the French Revolution and the October Revolution.

== See also ==
- Anti-Stalinist Left
- Bloodlands
- Comparison of Nazism and Stalinism
- Crimes against humanity under communist regimes
- Criticism of communist party rule
- Criticism of Marxism
- The Great Terror
- The Gulag Archipelago
- The Stalinist Legacy
- Historikerstreit
- Le Livre noir du capitalisme
- Le Livre noir du colonialisme
- Mass killings under communist regimes
- Le Passé d'une illusion
- Prague Declaration
- Mao: The Unknown Story
- Stalinism
- The Black Book of Capitalism: A farewell to the market economy
- The God that Failed – 1949 collection of anti-communist essays
- The Soviet Story

== Notes ==
Rémi Kauffer
