= Russian famine of 1921–1922 =

Famine in the Russian Soviet Federative Socialist Republic

Russian famine of 1921–1922 Голод в Поволжье
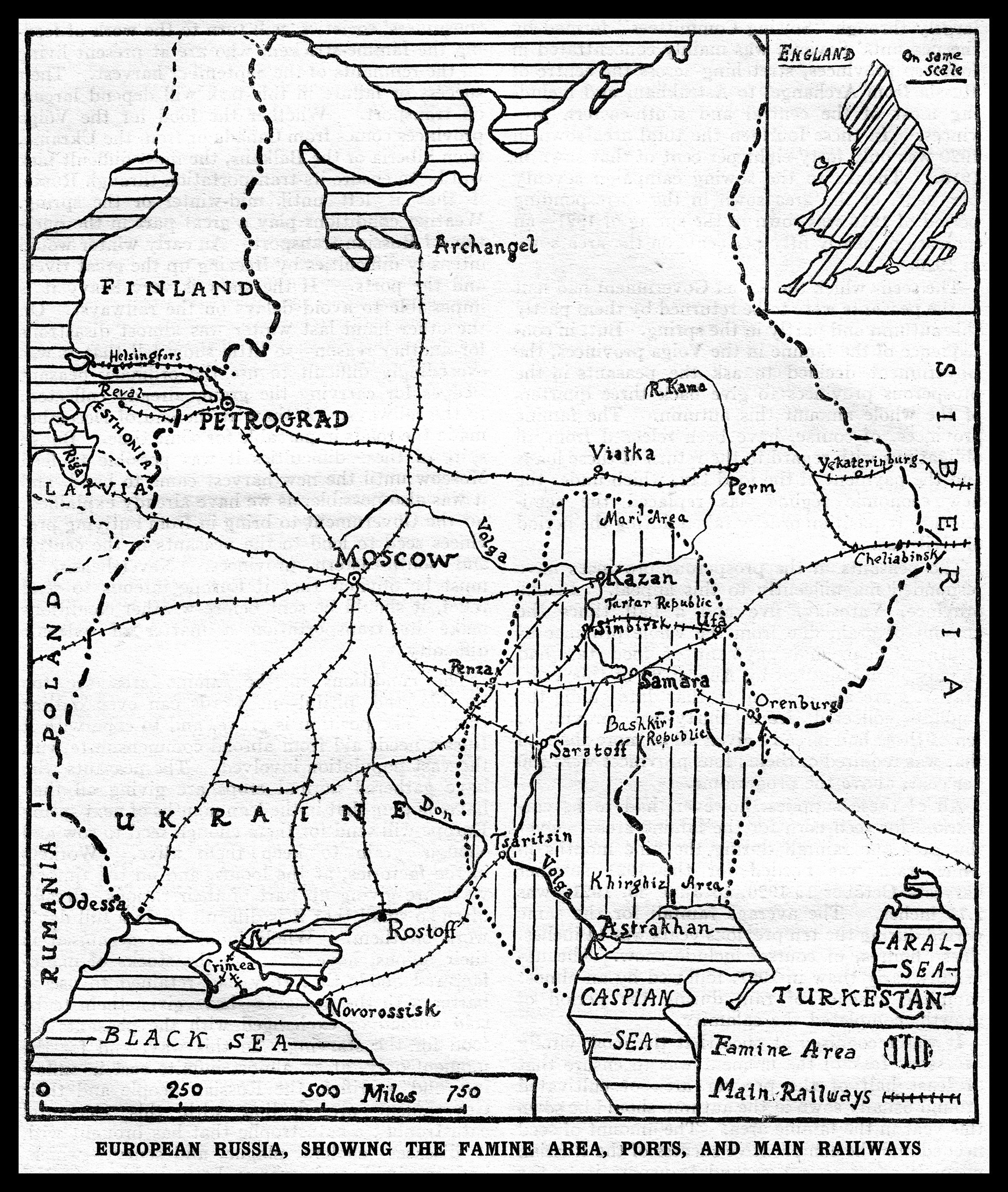
- The famine area in the fall of 1921
- Country: Russian Soviet Federative Socialist Republic
- Location: Primarily Volga region, Ural River
- Coordinates: 48.7081814°N 44.5133608°E
- Period: 1921–1922
- Total deaths: One to ten million (see death toll)
- Causes: Aftermath of World War I, Russian Revolution, Russian Civil War, failures in the government policy of war communism (especially prodrazvyorstka)
- Relief: More than 768 million tons of flour, grain, rice, beans, pork, milk, and sugar (see Relief effort)

The Russian famine of 1921–1922, also known as the Povolzhye famine (Russian: Голод в Поволжье 'Volga region famine'), was a severe famine in the Russian Soviet Federative Socialist Republic that began early in the spring of 1921 and lasted until 1922. The famine resulted from the combined effects of severe drought, the continued effects of World War I, economic disturbance from the Russian Revolution, the Russian Civil War, and failures in the government policy of war communism (especially prodrazvyorstka). It was exacerbated by rail systems that could not distribute food efficiently.

The famine killed an estimated five million people and primarily affected the Volga and Ural River regions. Many of the starving resorted to cannibalism. The outbreaks of diseases such as cholera and typhus were also contributing factors to famine casualties.

== Origins ==
European Theatre of the Russian Civil War in 1918–1919

Before the famine began, Russia had suffered three-and-a-half years of World War I and additionally the Russian Civil War of 1918–1920, many of the conflicts being fought inside Russia. There were 7–12 million casualties during the Russian Civil War, mostly civilians. Historians have noted that both Tsarist Russia government councils and other opposition parties had advocated for food requisitioning prior to the ascent of the Bolsheviks.

Before the famine, all sides in the Russian Civil Wars of 1918–1921 (the Bolsheviks, the Whites, the Anarchists, and the seceding nationalities) had provisioned themselves by seizing food from those who grew it, giving it to their armies and supporters, and denying it to their enemies. The Bolshevik government had requisitioned supplies from the peasantry for little or nothing in exchange, which led peasants to drastically reduce their crop production.

== Cannibalism ==
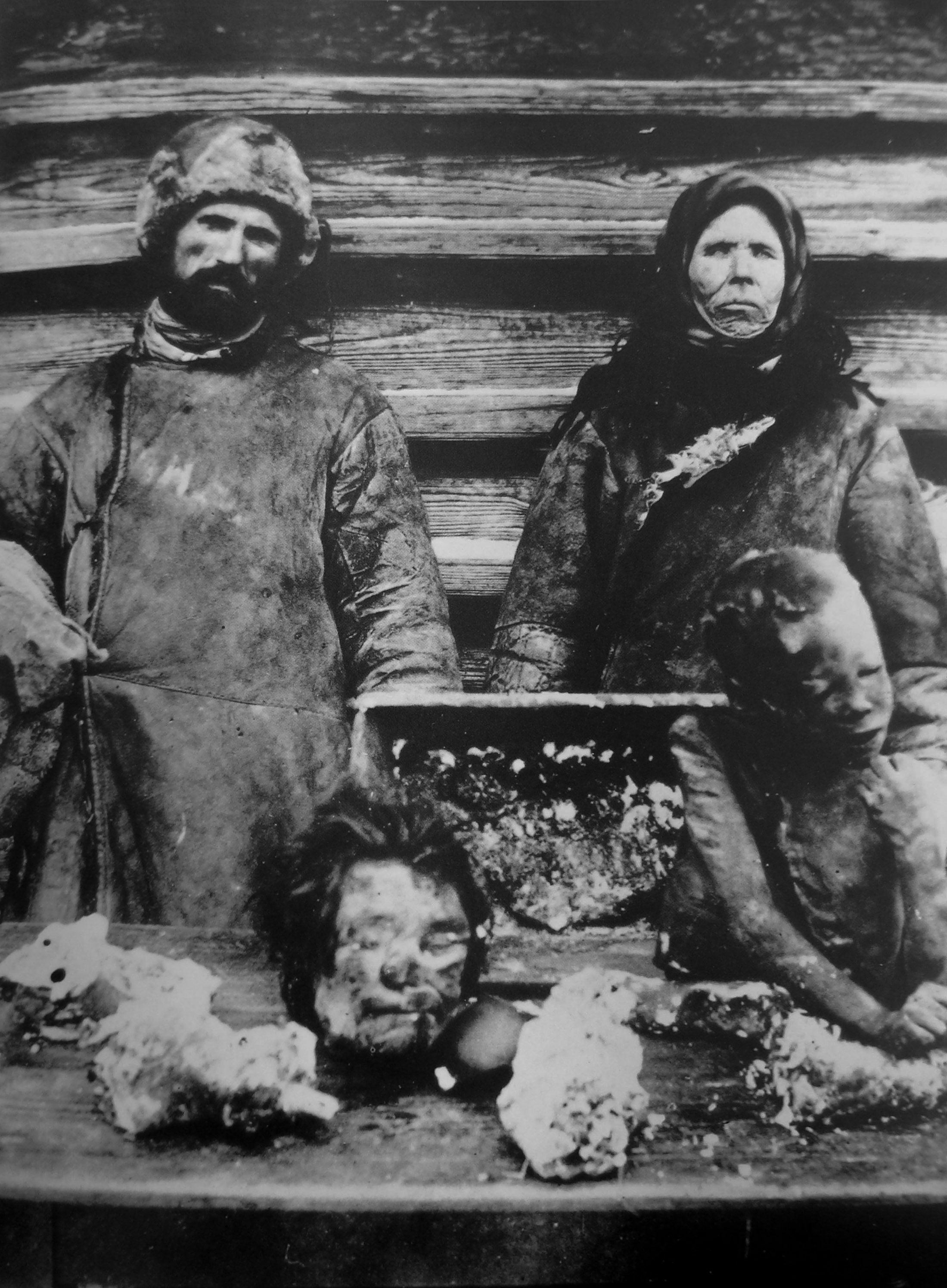
Cannibalism in Samara during the famine

The situation became so desperate that a considerable minority of the starving resorted to cannibalism. According to the historian Orlando Figes, "thousands of cases" were reported, with the number of cases that were never reported certainly even higher. In Samara, "ten butcher shops were closed for selling human flesh." In Pugachyov, "it was dangerous for children to go out after dark since there were known to be bands of cannibals and traders who killed them to eat or sell their tender flesh." An inhabitant of a nearby village stated: "There are several cafeterias in the village — and all of them serve up young children."

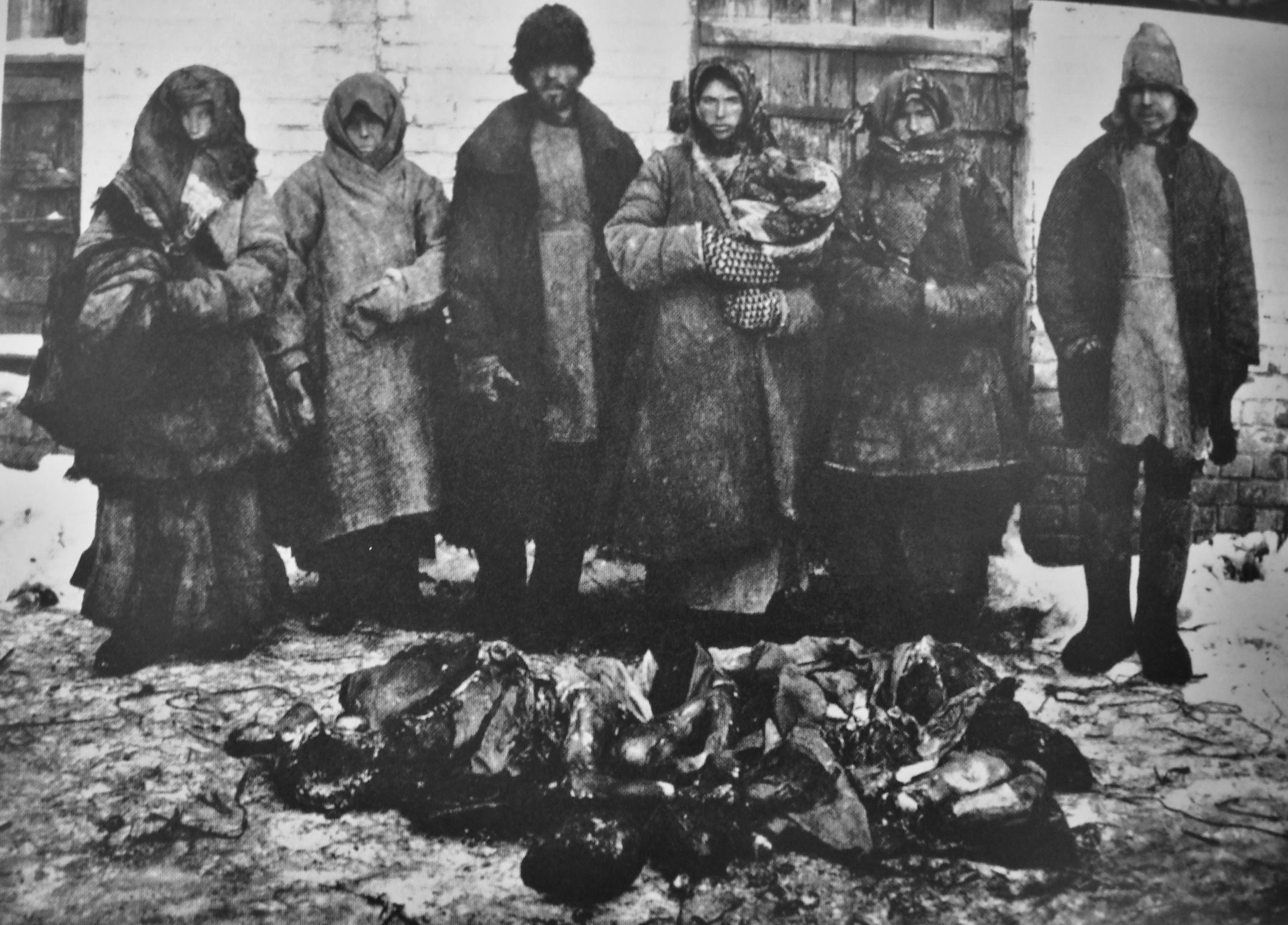
Six peasants of Buzuluk and the remains of humans they had eaten during the famine

This was no exception – Figes estimates "that a considerable proportion of the meat in Soviet factories in the Volga area ... was human flesh." Various gangs specialized in "capturing children, murdering them and selling the human flesh as horse meat or beef", with the buyers happy to have found a source of meat in a situation of extreme shortage and often willing not to "ask too many questions".

== Relief effort ==
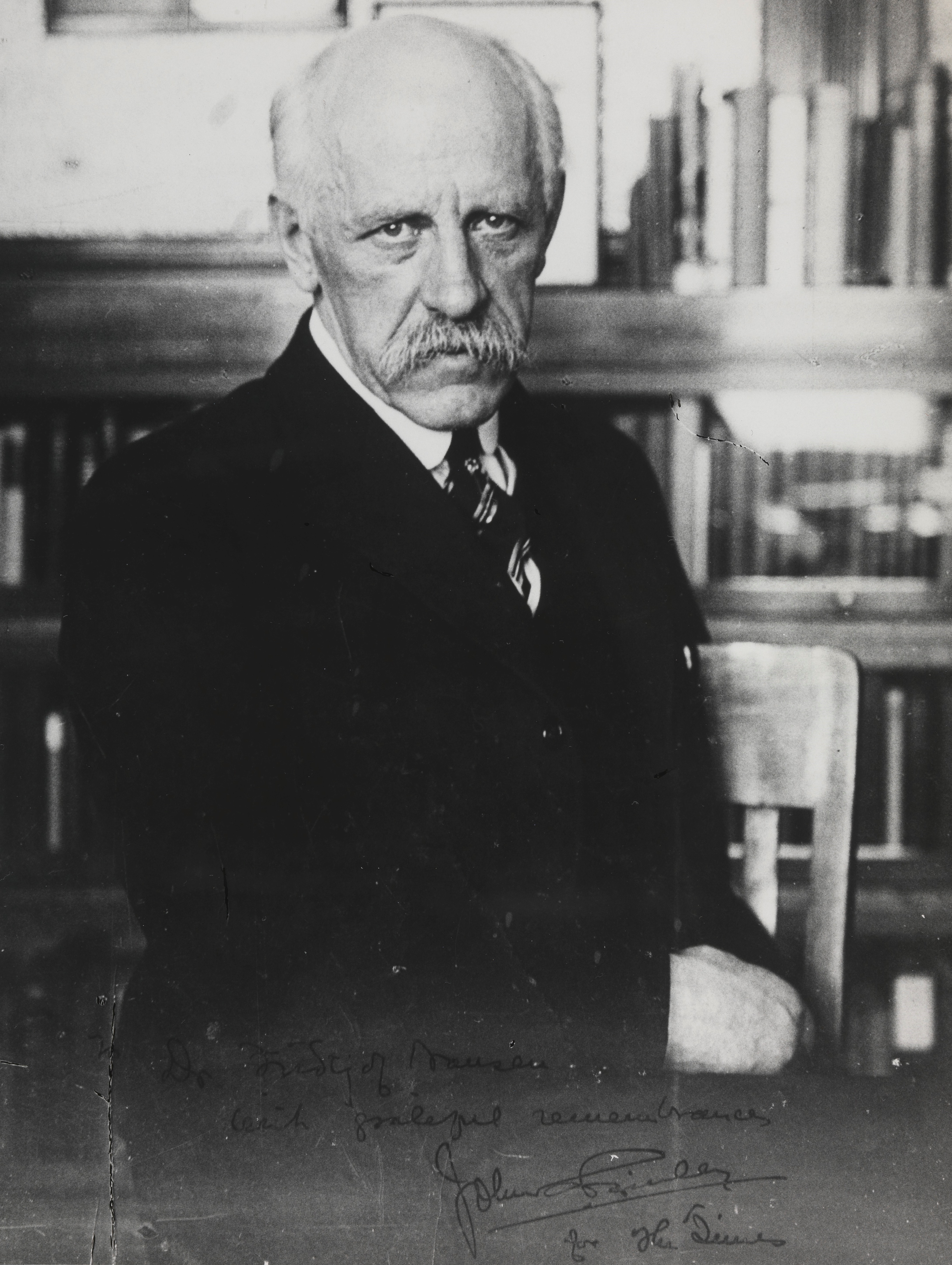
The Norwegian explorer and diplomat Fridtjof Nansen was honored with the 1922 Nobel Peace Prize, in part for his work as High Commissioner for Relief In Russia.

In the summer of 1921, during one of the worst famines in history, Vladimir Lenin, the head of the new Soviet government, along with Maxim Gorky, appealed in an open letter to "all honest European and American people" to "give bread and medicine". In an open letter to all nations, dated 13 July 1921, Gorky described the crop failure which had brought his country to the brink of starvation. Herbert Hoover, who would later become the U.S. President, responded immediately, and negotiations with Russia took place at the Latvian capital, Riga. A European effort was led by the famous Arctic explorer Fridtjof Nansen through the International Committee for Russian Relief (ICRR).

Hoover's American Relief Administration (ARA) had already been distributing food aid throughout Europe since 1914. After the Germans invaded Belgium in 1914, Hoover set up the Belgian Relief Committee to alleviate the devastation and starvation that followed. As World War I expanded, the ARA grew, and it next entered northern France and assisted France and Germany from 1914 to 1919. In 1920 and 1921, it provided one meal a day to 3.2 million children in Finland, Estonia, various Russian regions, Latvia, Lithuania, Poland, Ukraine, Czechoslovakia, Austria, Hungary, and Armenia. When it began its emergency feeding operation in Russia, it planned to feed about one million Russian children for a full year. Other bodies such as the American Friends Service Committee, the British Friends' War Victims Relief Committee and the International Save the Children Union, with the British Save the Children Fund as the major contributor, also later took part. As the historian Douglas Smith writes, the food relief would probably help "save communist Russia from ruin."

The United States was the first country to respond, with Hoover appointing Colonel William N. Haskell to direct the ARA in Russia. Within a month, ships loaded with food were headed for Russia. The main contributor to the international relief effort would be the ARA, which was founded and directed by Hoover. It had agreed to provide food for a million people, mostly children, but within a year it was feeding more than 10 times that number daily.

The ARA insisted on autonomy as to how the food would be distributed and stated its requirement that food would be given without regard to "race, creed or social status", a condition that was stated in Section 25 of the Riga agreement. U.S. spokesmen said that it would also want to have storage facilities built in Russia, wrote the journalist Charles Bartlett, and would expect to have full access to those to assure that food was distributed properly. (Note: At a conference in Geneva on 15 August organised by the International Committee of the Red Cross and the League of Red Cross Societies, the International Committee for Russian Relief (ICRR) was set up with Dr. Fridtjof Nansen as its High Commissioner. Nansen headed to Moscow, where he signed an agreement with Soviet Foreign Minister Georgy Chicherin that left the ICRR in full control of its operations. At the same time, fundraising for the famine relief operation began in earnest in Britain, with all the elements of a modern emergency relief operation—full-page newspaper advertisements, local collections, and a fundraising film shot in the famine area. By September, a ship had been despatched from London carrying 600 tons of supplies. The first feeding centre was opened in October in Saratov.)

Hoover also demanded for Russia to use some of its gold holdings to defray the cost of the relief effort. He secured $18 million from the Russian leadership, $20 million from the U.S. Congress, $8 million from the U.S. military, and additional money from U.S. charities to arrive at a total of approximately $78 million from all those sources. After an agreement was finally signed at Riga, the U.S. set up its first kitchen in Petrograd, where 1.6 million people had already starved to death.

For almost two years now a scant two hundred Americans, on a battle line far longer than the western front, have been fighting a foe more pitiless than any the allied armies faced. From the Baltic to the Caspian Sea, from the Crimea to the Urals, they have conquered the famine, saved more lives than were lost in the World War, healed a sorely-suffering people of the diseases which threatened to sweep the whole of Europe, won the benedictions of a great, but stricken, nation, achieved the world's greatest adventure in humanity!

— W. Howard Ramsey, newspaper editor

Over 10 million people were fed daily, with the bulk of food coming from the ARA, which had provided more than 768 million tons of flour, grain, rice, beans, pork, milk, and sugar, with a value of over $98 million. To transport and distribute the food after it was collected in the U.S., the ARA used 237 ships, under the direction of 200 Americans and with the help of 125,000 Russians on location for unloading, warehousing, hauling, weighing, cooking and serving the food in more than 21,000 new kitchens.

Even after the food had reached the people in need, Colonel Haskell informed Hoover of an unexpected new danger. He explained that fuel was unavailable for heating or cooking and millions of Russian peasants had clothing consisting mostly of rags, which would lead to certain death from cold exposure during the approaching winter.

The children at risk included those in orphanages and other institutions, as they usually had only one garment, often made of flour sacks, and they lacked shoes, stockings, underclothing, or any other clothing to keep warm. Also at risk were children living at home with their parents, who also lacked enough clothing, which made them unable to reach the American relief kitchens. Haskell cabled Hoover that at least one million children were in extreme need of clothes. Hoover quickly initiated a plan for collecting and sending clothing packages to Russia, which would come from donations by individuals, businesses and banks.

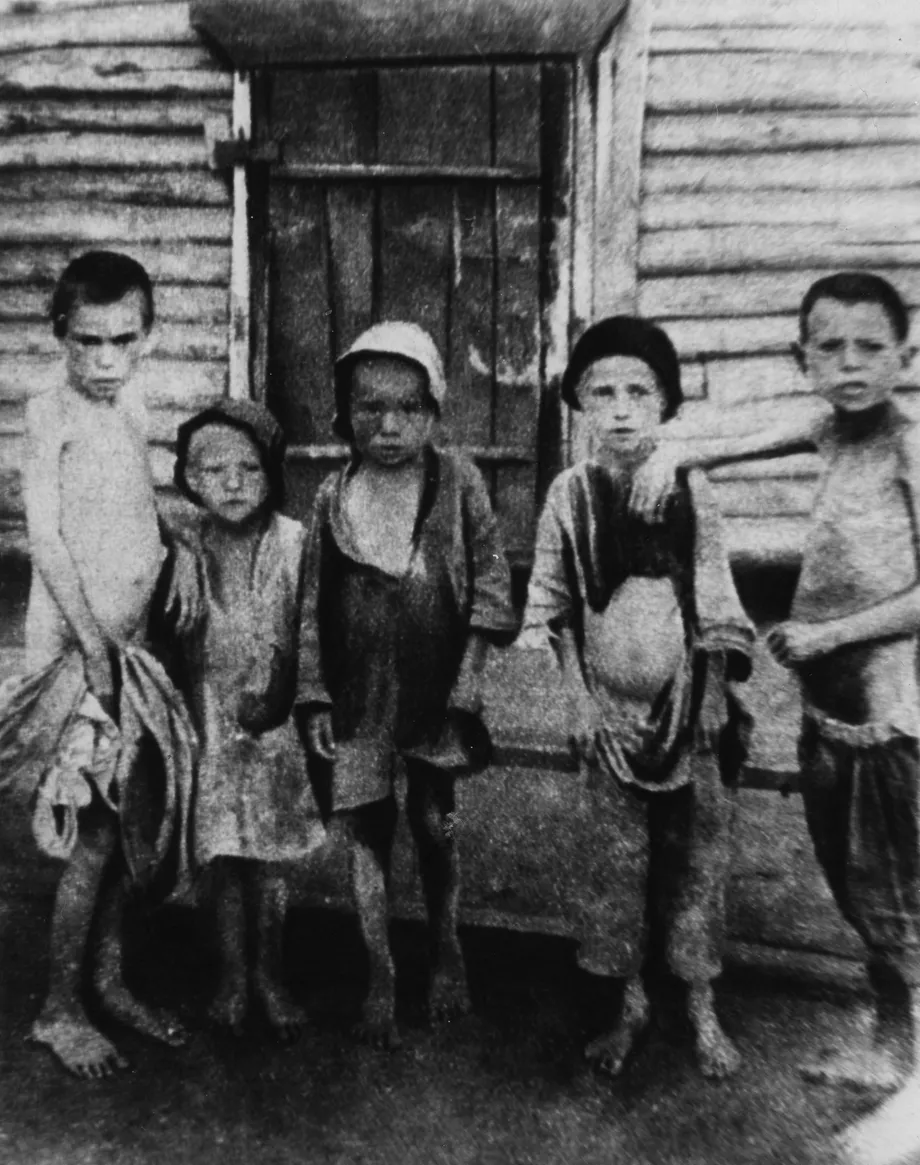
Starving children in 1922

Medical needs were also paramount. As noted by Dr. Henry Beeuwkes, the chief of the Medical Division in Russia, American relief was supplying over 16,000 hospitals, which were treating more than a million persons daily. Because those institutions were scattered over areas with few railroads and often poor roads, with some hospitals over a thousand miles from the main supply base in Moscow, the task was monumental. Dr. Louis L. Shapiro, an army colonel who was one of the ARA's medical directors in Russia, recalled that southern Russia had little more than "mud ruts for roads, with limitless prairies." On one trip, with few car necessities or regular gas, he drove 150 miles on tires without inner tubes, instead stuffed with straw. "After our kitchens were established and our clinics able to distribute medical supplies" said Shapiro, "children who had been eating a diet of clay and leather scrapings, responded quite rapidly."

According to Dr. Beeuwkes, everything was in short supply, including beds, blankets, sheets, and most medical tools and medicines. Operations were performed in unheated operating rooms without anesthetics and often with bare hands. Wounds were dressed with newspapers or rags. Water supplies were polluted, with much of the plumbing unusable.

To help the widespread medical emergency, the ARA distributed medical supplies, which included over 2,000 necessities, from medicines to surgical instruments. There were 125,000 medical packages, weighing 15 million pounds, sent on 69 ships. According to Dr. Shapiro, when the ARA left Russia in 1923, after two years of relief efforts, "the Russians had been pulled out of the slough of famine and death. I can say without boasting that no relief organization ever worked so hard to complete its task."

In May 1922, Lev Kamenev, President of the Moscow Soviet and deputy chairman of all Russian famine relief committees, wrote a letter to Haskell that thanked him and the ARA for its help and also paid tribute to the American people:

The government of the Russian nation will never forget the generous help that was afforded them in the terrible calamity and dangers visited upon them.... I wish to express, on behalf of the Soviet government, my satisfaction and thanks to the American Relief Administration, through your person, for the substantial support which they are offering to the calamity stricken population of the Volga area.

By the summer of 1923, it was estimated that the U.S. relief that was given to Russia amounted to over twice the total of relief given it by all other foreign organizations combined. European agencies co-ordinated by the ICRR also fed two million people a day, while the International Save the Children Union fed up to 375,000. The operation was hazardous since several workers died of cholera, and it was not without its critics, including the London Daily Express, which first denied the severity of the famine and then argued that the money would better be spent in the United Kingdom.

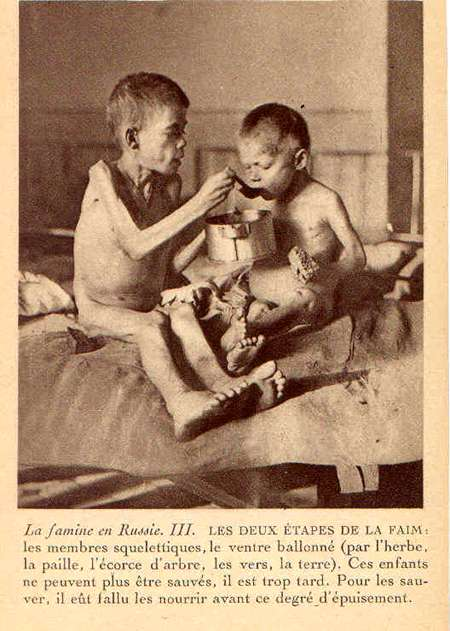
Nansen's photos on postcards were meant to raise awareness about the famine.

Throughout 1922 and 1923, as famine was still widespread and the ARA was still providing relief supplies, grain was exported by the Soviet government to raise funds for the revival of industry, which seriously endangered Western support for relief. The new Soviet government insisted that if the AYA suspended relief, the ARA was to arrange a foreign loan for them of about $10,000,000 1923 dollars; the ARA was unable to do so and continued to ship in food past the grain being sold abroad.

US contribution to the Russian famine relief effort	
Children fed daily	4,173,339
Adults fed daily	6,317,958
Maximum number fed daily	10,491,297
Number of meals served	1,750,000,000
Number of separate kitchens opened	21,435
People clothed	333,125
Medical supplies value	$7,685,000
Hospitals provided with supplies	16,400
Number of inoculations given	6,396,598
Number of vaccinations given	1,304,401
Tons of food provided	912,121
Tons of medical supplies provided	7,500
Number of U.S. ships used	237

== Death toll ==
As with other large-scale famines, the range of estimates is considerable. An official Soviet publication of the early 1920s concluded that about five million deaths occurred in 1921 from famine and related disease, the number that is usually quoted in textbooks. More conservative figures counted not more than a million, and another assessment, based on the ARA's medical division, spoke of two million. On the other side of the scale, some sources spoke of ten million dead. According to Bertrand M. Patenaude, "such a number hardly seems extravagant after the many tens of millions of victims of war, famine, and terror in the twentieth century."

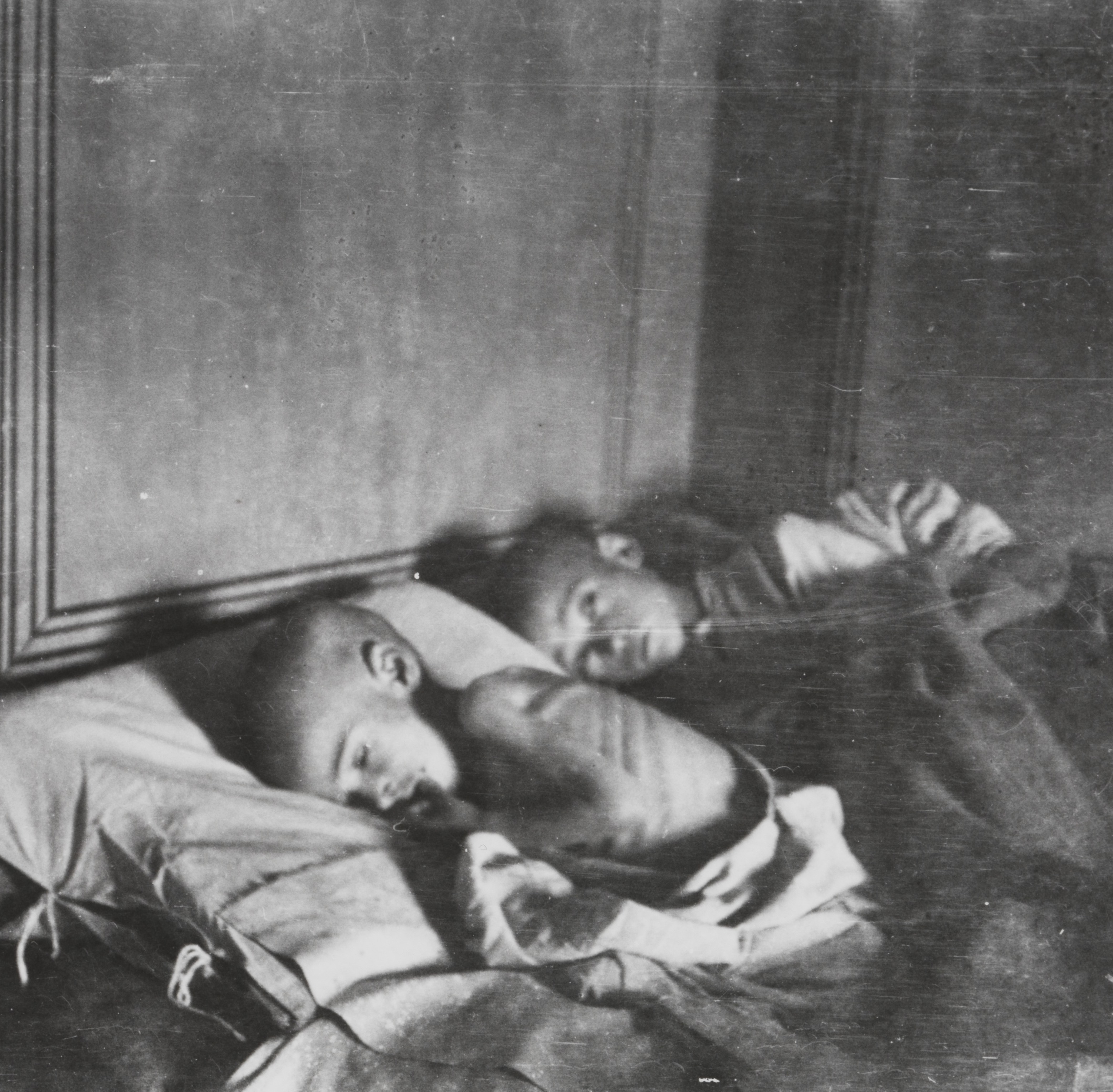
Fridtjof Nansen's journey to the famine regions of Russia, 1921

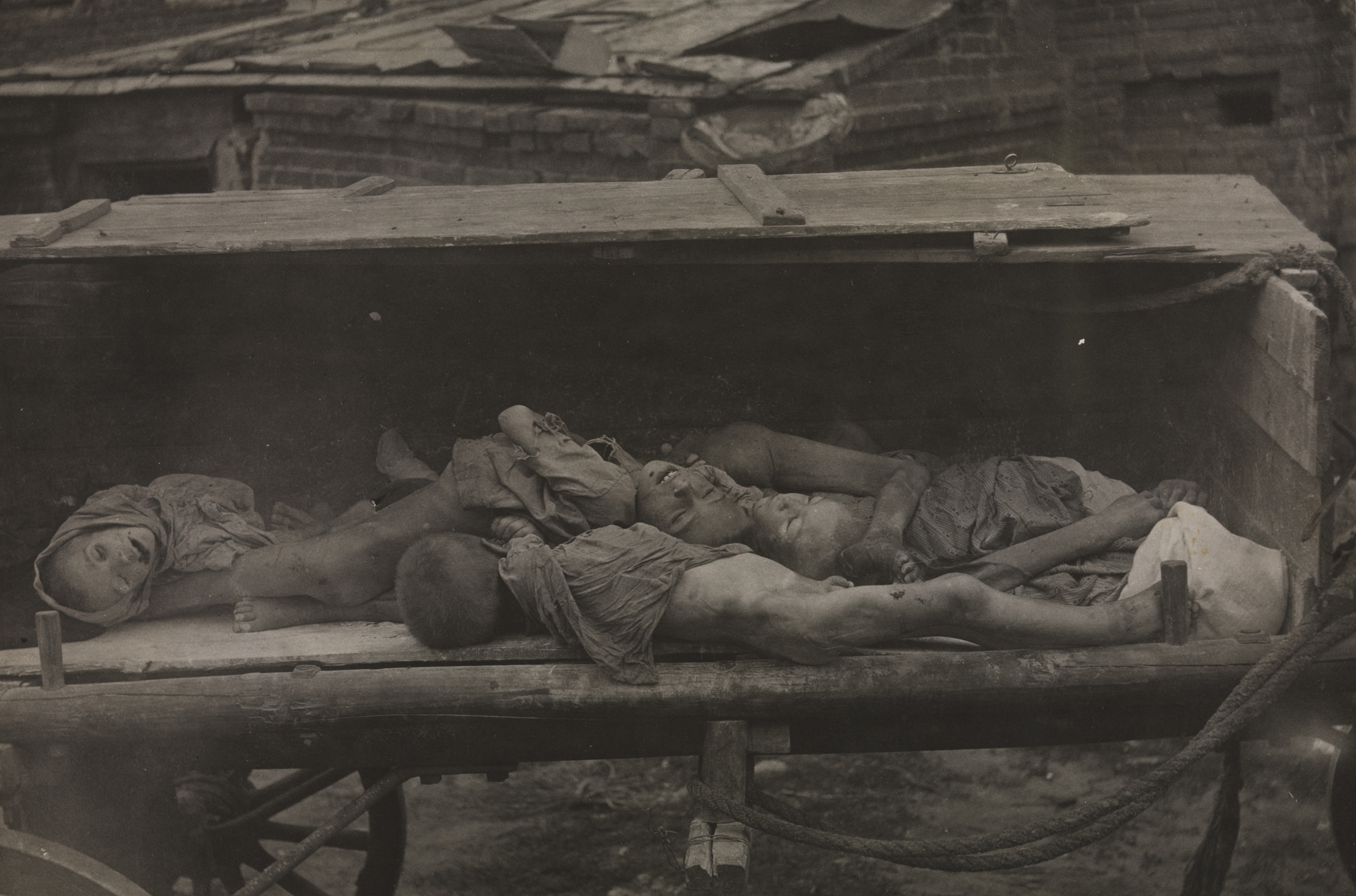
Children's corpses collected on a wagon in Samara, 1921

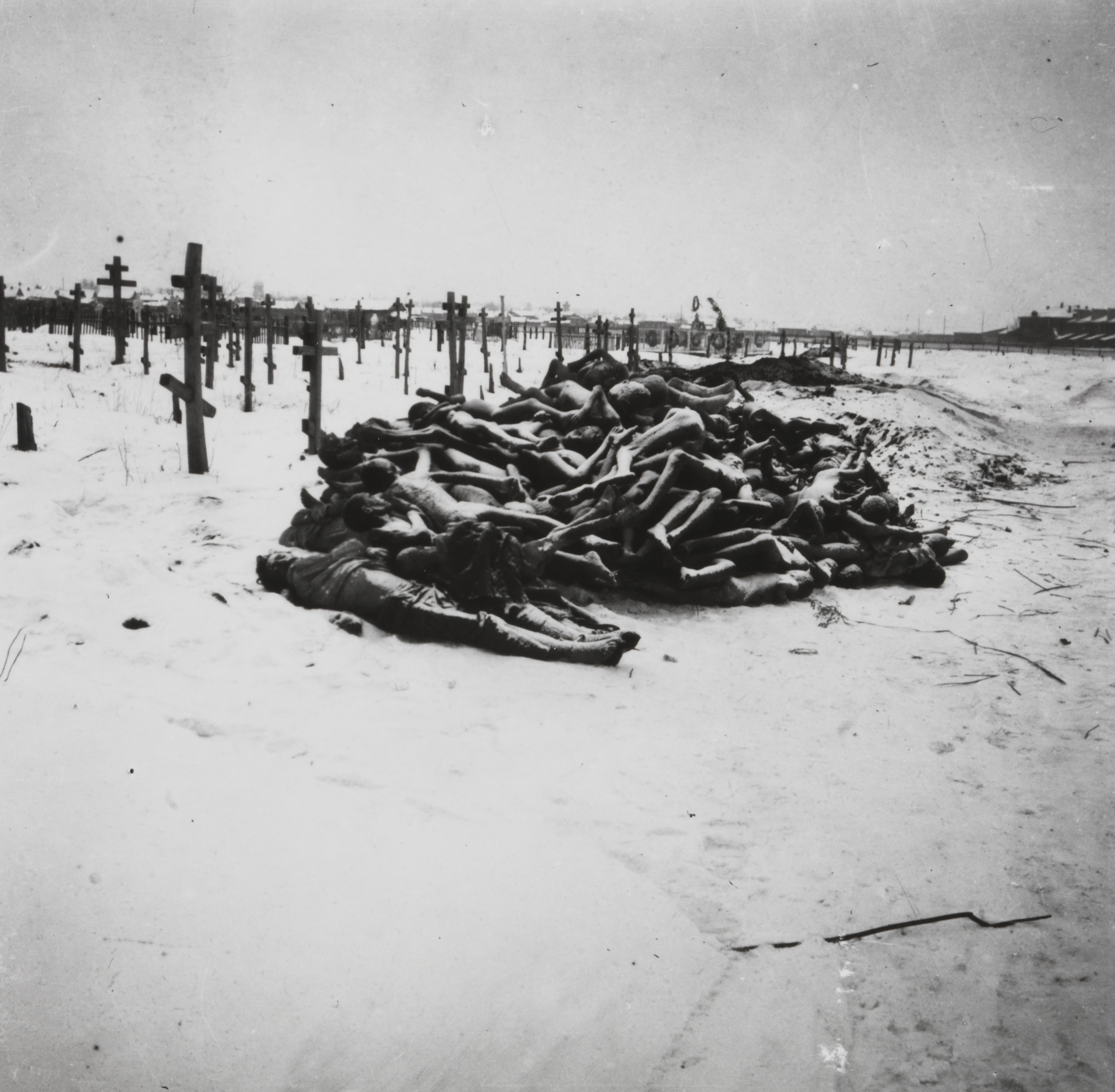
Victims of the famine in Buzuluk, next to Samara

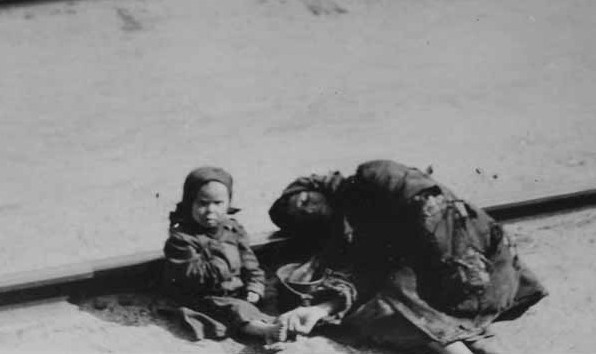
Victims of the Russian famine, 1922

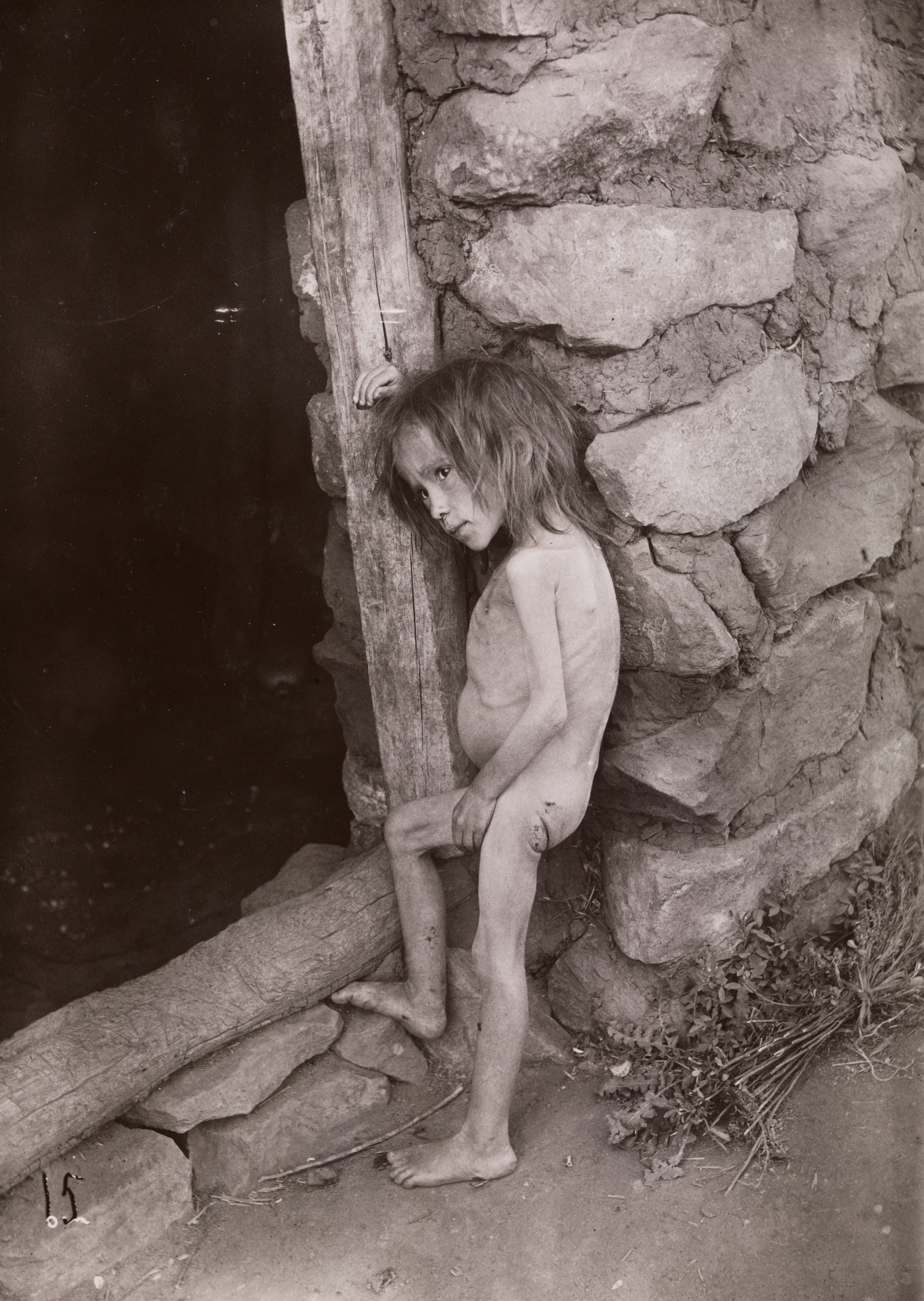
Starving Russian girl in Buguruslan, 1921

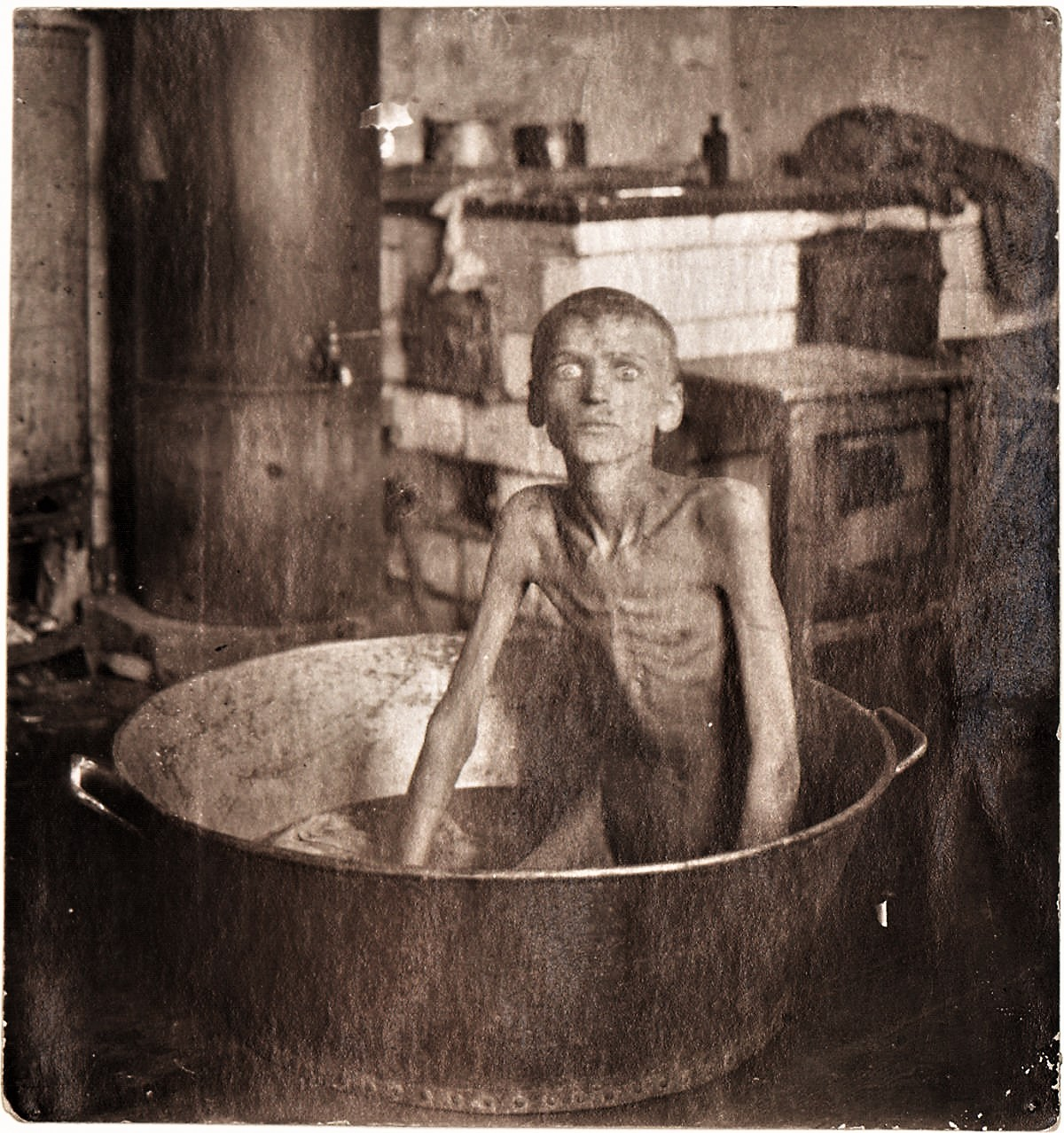
A starving boy from the village of Blagoveshchenka (Zaporizhzhia, Ukraine), who during the famine of 1921–1922 killed his three-year-old brother and ate him

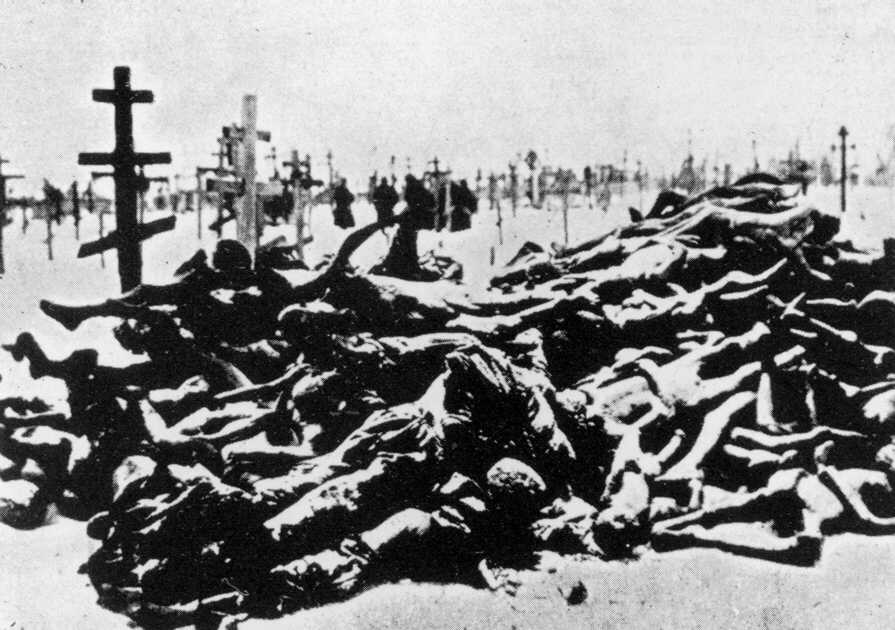
Victims of the 1921 famine during the Russian Civil War

== Political uses ==
The famine came at the end of six-and-a-half years of unrest and violence (World War I, the two Russian Revolutions of 1917, and the Russian Civil War). Many political and military factions were involved in the events, and most of them have been accused by their enemies of having contributed to or even bearing sole responsibility for the famine.

The Bolsheviks started a campaign of seizing church property in 1922. That year, over 4.5 million golden roubles of property were seized. Of those, one million gold roubles were spent for famine relief. In a secret 19 March 1922 letter to the Politburo, Lenin expressed an intention to seize several hundred million golden roubles for famine relief.

In Lenin's secret letter to the Politburo, he explains that the famine provides an opportunity against the church. Richard Pipes argued that the famine was used politically as an excuse for the Bolshevik leadership to persecute the Orthodox Church, which held significant sway over much of the peasantry.

Russian anti-Bolshevik white émigrés in London, Paris, and elsewhere also used the famine as a media opportunity to highlight the iniquities of the Soviet regime to prevent trade with and official recognition of the Bolshevik government.

== End of the famine ==
Lenin was eventually convinced by the famine, the Kronstadt rebellion, large-scale peasant uprisings such as the Tambov Rebellion, and the failure of a German general strike to reverse his policy at home and abroad. He decreed the New Economic Policy on 15 March 1921.

=== Foreign aid ===
Aid from outside Soviet Russia was initially rejected. The American Relief Administration (ARA), which Herbert Hoover formed to help the victims of starvation of World War I, offered assistance to Lenin in 1919 if it had full say over the Russian railway network and handed out food impartially to all. Lenin refused that as interference in Russian internal affairs.

The famine also helped produce an opening to the West. Lenin now allowed relief organizations to bring aid. War relief was no longer required in Western Europe, and the ARA had an organization set up in Poland that relieved the Polish famine, which had begun in the winter of 1919–1920.

== 2022 Russian documentary film ==
On 24 September 2022, at the Oktyabr cinema in Moscow, the Russian documentary film Hunger or Famine (Russian: Голод) premiered which depicts the mass famine in the Volga region, Ukraine, the Urals, Bashkiria, Samara and Chelyabinsk regions, Kazakhstan and Western Siberia affecting over 35 oblasts of Soviet Russia in the early 1920s and a total population of approximately 90 million people. The film was directed by Tatyana Sorokina with Aleksandr Arkhangelsky writing the script and Maxim Kournikov providing the inspiration behind the creation of the film. On 30 October 2022, Famine was first shown at a public theater in Yekaterinburg. In November 2022, the Russian Ministry of Culture banned the distribution of Голод in Russia. In December 2022, Famine received the monthly journalistic award from Redkollegia and, in April 2023, it received the Audience Prize and a special mention jury diploma at the 2023 Artdocfest.

== See also ==
- 1921 Mari wildfires
- 1921–1922 famine in Tatarstan
- 1921–1923 famine in Ukraine
- American Relief Administration
- Cannibalism in Europe
- Famines in Russia and the USSR
- Fram (play)
- Kazakh famine of 1919–1922
- List of famines
- Pomgol
- Soviet famine of 1930–1933
  - Holodomor (Ukrainian famine 1932–1933)
- Soviet famine of 1946–1947

== Sources ==
- Breen, Rodney (1994), "Saving Enemy Children: Save the Children's Russian Relief Organisation, 1921–1923", Disasters, 18 (3): 221–237, doi:10.1111/j.1467-7717.1994.tb00309.x, PMID 7953492.
- Cameron, Sarah Isabel. The Hungry Steppe: Soviet Kazakhstan and the Kazakh Famine, 1921–1934 (PhD. Diss. Yale University, 2011).
- Edmondson, Charles M. "The politics of hunger: The Soviet response to famine, 1921". Soviet Studies 29.4 (October 1977): 506–518. JSTOR 150533.
- Fisher, Harold Henry. The Famine in Soviet Russia, 1919–1923: The Operations of the American Relief Administration (Macmillan, 1927). online
- Fromkin, David: Peace to End All Peace (1989 hc) p. 360 (on Tsarist corruption and the closure of the Dardanelles).
- Furet, François (1999) [1995], Passing of an Illusion.
- Jansen, Dinah (2015), "After October: Russian Liberalism as a Work-in Progress, 1917–1945" Kingston, Queen's University. PhD Dissertation.
- Kennan, George Frost (1961), Russia and the West under Lenin and Stalin, Boston, pp. 141–150, 168, 179–185. Default reference for the historical and aftermath sections.
- —— (1979), The Decline of Bismarck's European Order: Franco-Russian Relations, 1875–1890, Princeton, p. 387.
- Patenaude, Bertrand M. The big show in Bololand: The American relief expedition to Soviet Russia in the famine of 1921 (Stanford University Press, 2002).
- Pipes, Richard (1995) [1994]. Russia under the Bolshevik regime 1919–1924. London: Vintage. ISBN 978-0-679-76184-6.
- Sasson, Tehila (July 2016). "From Empire to Humanity: The Russian Famine and the Imperial Origins of International Humanitarianism". Journal of British Studies. 55 (3): 519–537. doi:10.1017/jbr.2016.57.
- Trotsky, Leon (1930). My Life. Chapter 38. His advice to Lenin.
- Weissman, Benjamin M. Herbert Hoover and famine relief to Soviet Russia, 1921–1923 (Hoover Institution Press, 1974).
- Werth, Nicolas; Panné, Jean-Louis; Paczkowski, Andrzej; Bartosek, Karel; Margolin, Jean-Louis (October 1999), Courtois, Stéphane (ed.), The Black Book of Communism: Crimes, Terror, Repression, Harvard University Press, pp. 92–97, 116–121, ISBN 978-0-674-07608-2.
- Yakovlev, Alexander N. A Century of Violence in Soviet Russia. Yale University Press, 2002, ISBN 0-300-08760-8, pp. 155–156 • (famine of 1921)
