= Posledgol =

Soviet relief commission

Central Commission for the Struggle against Consequences of Famine (Центральная комиссия по борьбе с последствиями Голода, abbreviated as Posledgol) was a Central Commission under the All-Russian Central Executive Committee created to combat the consequences of the famine of 1921-1922. It was the successor of Pomgol and was created by a resolution of the All-Russian Central Executive Committee. They collaborated with foreign philanthropic institutions that were allowed to provide relief to the Soviet population. Posledgol mainly planned and supervised relief activities. The commission received resources from state and donations by population. They portended enormous complications and inadequacies in handling the actual situation in the famine areas.

The commission included representatives of the State Planning Committee, All-Russian Central Council of Trade Unions, Children's Commission of the All-Russian Central Executive Committee, People's Commissariat of Agriculture, ROKK, International Working Committee for Famine Relief, etc. The committee was decentralised as earlier Soviet famine relief suffered from breakdowns in communication. It also set a precedent for a famine relief agency oriented toward agricultural recovery.

== History ==
On 12 September 1922, Pomgol was ordered to be abolished and replaced by Posledgol by a decree of the All-Russian Central Executive Committee. On the same day, Pomgol committees were dissolved and the resolution expressed gratitude to the ARA for donating eighty million gold rubles and for its contribution. The new committee took over Pomgol responsibilities but turned especially toward longer-term projects. Posledgol would engage in food relief only for homeless children and a small number of ill or disabled adults. The new committee was focused on economic reconstruction of the famine regions and its main goal was to reconstruct the economy by repairing the transportation network, rebuilding dilapidated or destroyed machinery, and creating new industries throughout the afflicted region.

On 15 October 1922, Pomgol was reorganized as Posledgol which was led by Lev Kamenev. The reorganisation was due to shift in government policy from “struggle against the famine” to “struggle against the consequences of the famine” This new policy covered up the situation when necessary which led to confusion and inadequacies in places where famine was experienced. The commission was formed under the All-Russian Central Council of Trade Unions. Crimean Pomgol changed its name to Posledgol on 19 October 1922.

Posledgol lottery ticket priced at ten rubles, 1923

Posledgol also raised funds through a lottery in 1923.

A special Posledgol 1% tax was levied on population, excluding single housewives households and those without livestock, for famine relief. The 0.5% tax was extracted in famine areas. The tax was enacted in November 1922. Posledgol and Nansen Mission organized the sale of Russian handicrafts abroad for “the reconstruction of the peasant craft industry”.

By mid-1922, ARA was increasingly seen as a burden by the Bolsheviks. Posledgol started waging a campaign against the American Relief Administration. On 1 October 1922, the campaign to discredit the ARA began. Posledgol started insisting on a revision of the Riga Agreement and demanded that the ARA cover its shipping, residence, and fuel expenses, and sign an agreement with Soviet trade unions. They were also forbidden to operate kitchens in areas where government institutions were present. Centers and kitchens were to be administered under the coordination of Posledgol. On 31 October, orders went out to all branches from Olga Kameneva that Posledgol must impose regulations on foreign open kitchens, "which must result in closing most of them."

In February 1923, a joint decision was made by the Posledgol and the Children's Commission to re-evacuation of 200 children. Posledgol send a message to its representative in Czechoslovakia, it was emphasized that this decision is “final” and “all new petitions of the Czechoslovak Institutions on this issue are useless”.

In April 1923, ARA was ordered to turn over the proceeds from sales of empty grain sacks to Posledgol. On 26 May, Karl Lander ordered to not allow ARA to send its medical supplies to hospitals or private individuals and instead hand over all containers and surplus food to Posledgol. In a letter send to all branches, he told that the Americans were soon going to withdraw and ordered to build a fund of food and medicines which were to be held awaiting orders from the Posledgol in Moscow.

In May 1923, ARA was ordered to sell its motor vehicles to the highest bidders. Plenipotentiaries blocked the private car sales by ARA by intimidating potential buyer. In Samara, government refused to provide rail service for shipping out its motorcars. The Simbirsk ARA then got a copy of Lander's confidential instructions where he ordered to prevent the sale of ARA automobiles. Lander then asked the ARA to donate its motor transport to Posledgol. In the end, ninety-five vehicles were sold to the Posledgol for $100,000.

In June 1923, before leaving Soviet Union, the ARA started either selling its property or turned it over to the JDC. Posledgol wanted everything to be turned over to them free of charge. The Posledgol representative in Odessa stopped ARA from selling off the property including empty boxes. However, some typewriters were sold to private individuals and 90,000 arshins (about 70,000 yards) of textiles was turned over to the JDC. Soviet authorities were threatened not to take any measures against typewriter buyers. Therefore, the authorities delayed the punishment until after the ARA departure.

Posledgol organized repair and construction of public road and land reclamation works in Dagestan. In the second half of 1923, Posledgol allotted 7,132 pounds of bread and 14,626 arshins of calico for road and reclamation. In total, Dagestan Central Committee of Posledgol allotted 122,285 rubles for road work during its lifetime.

On 1 August 1923, Posledgol was liquidated and was succeeded by Committee on Foreign Aid (Komitet zagranichnoi pomoshchi, or KZP) led by Olga Kameneva.

== See also ==
- Pomgol
