= Pomgol =

Organizations for relief of starving in Russia

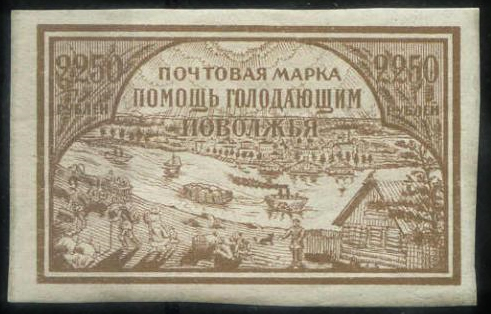
A 1921 Pomgol stamp

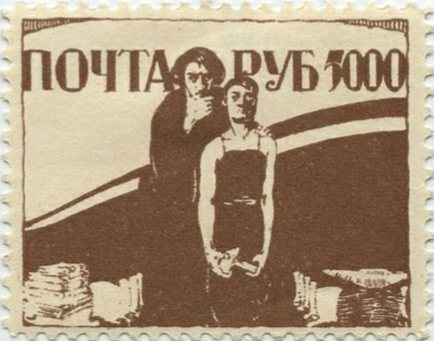
A bogus Pomgol stamp created by Marco Fontana (Italy)

Pomgol (Russian: Помгол) was the name of two organizations created in the Russian SFSR during the Russian famine of 1921. The name is an abbreviation of the Russian term "Помощь голодающим" or "Relief for Starving".

The first issue was four stamps issued on December 31, 1921, to help the starving Volga.

The second issue was four 1922 stamps with images of aircraft, postal cars, steamboats, and trains.

== Pomgol All-Russian Public Committee ==
The first Pomgol was created by Patriarch Tikhon, named civic All-Union Public Committee for the Relief of Starving (Pomgol Public Committee, Всероссийский общественный комитет помощи голодающим) It included notable Russian people: scientists, artists, church leaders, public activists, many of which were of non-Bolshevik persuasion. Tikhon appealed to the international religious community and soon some aid began to arrive. The Soviet government disliked this course of affairs, and Tikhon's Pomgol was disbanded on August 27, 1921. Instead, governmental Pomgol was established.

== Pomgol Central Commission of VTsIK ==
The Pomgol Central Commission (Центральная комиссия помощи голодающим при ВЦИК) established by the Soviet government (VTsIK) existed during July 1921 — October 1922. It was headed by Mikhail Kalinin, chairman of VTsIK. It coordinated all related to the famine relief. To this end and with the proposal of Maxim Gorky, it established the Pomgol Commissions at all administrative levels of the Soviet state.

== Pomgol Commission and famine ==
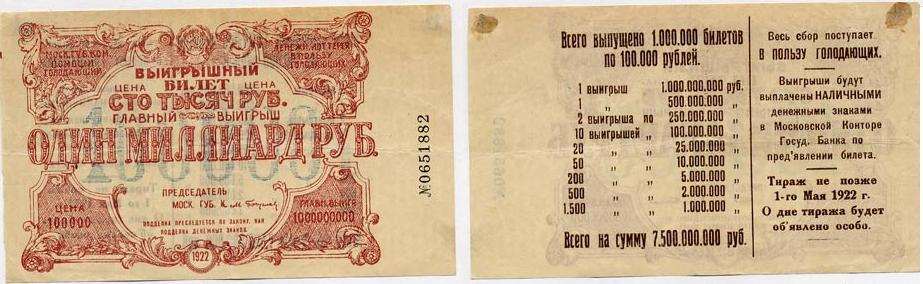
A pomgol lottery ticket

Among the activities of pomgol was the first Soviet statewide lottery with all proceeds directed for famine relief. Pomgol took an active part in requisition of Russian Orthodox Church valuables.

In mid-1922 the Soviet Union declared that the immediate danger of the famine was over and replaced the policy of "struggle against the famine" with the "struggle against the consequences of the famine". Most members of the organization were arrested by the Soviet authorities for 'counterrevolutionary crimes' in August 1922. Gorky left Russia earlier and managed to avoid arrest.

Pomgol CC was replaced by the Posledgol Central Commission of VTsIK.
