= Staline: le tyran rouge =

- Written by: Mathieu Schwartz
- Directed by: Serge de Sampigny
- Country of origin: France
- Original language: French

Production
- Running time: 85 minutes

Original release
- Release: 13 March 2007

Stalin: le tyran rouge (Stalin: The Red Tyrant) is a 2007 French television documentary film by Mathieu Schwartz, Serge de Sampigny, Yvan Demeulandre and the historic consultant Nicolas Werth about the government of Joseph Stalin in the Soviet Union.
