= Amir Weiner =

American historian (born 1961)

- Born: September 17, 1961 (age 65)

Academic background
- Education: Hebrew University of Jerusalem; Columbia University

Academic work
- Discipline: Soviet history
- Institutions: Stanford University Department of History

Amir Weiner (born 17 September 1961) is an American historian and associate professor of Soviet history at Stanford University. His interests include mass violence, population politics, totalitarianism, and World War II. Weiner is the director of Center for Russian, East European and Eurasian Studies, and his research includes the KGB and the Soviet Union's surveillance state. Weiner is a former research scholar for the Wilson Center, and he was affiliated with the Kennan Institute in 1994–1995.

== Biography ==
Weiner is the Director of Graduate Studies, and holds a B.A. degree from the Hebrew University of Jerusalem in Russian studies, and international relations (1987). He graduated in history (M.A. and Ph.D.) from Columbia University in 1990 and 1995, respectively. Weiner's works include Making Sense of War: The Second World War and the Fate of the Bolshevik Revolution (2002), published by Princeton University Press, and Landscaping the Human Garden: Twentieth-Century Population Management in a Comparative Framework (2003), published by Stanford University Press. He has also contributed to articles, chapters, and reviews in academic publishing and peer-reviewed academic journals, among them critical reviews of The Black Book of Communism (1997) and Bloodlands (2010).

== Bibliography ==
- Weiner, Amir (2002). Making Sense of War: The Second World War and the Fate of the Bolshevik Revolution (paperback ed.). Princeton University Press. ISBN 9780691095431 – via Google Books.
- Weiner, Amir (2003). Landscaping the Human Garden: Twentieth-century Population Management in a Comparative Framework (illustrated ed.). Stanford University Press. ISBN 9780804746304 – via Google Books.
- Weiner, Amir (May 2006). "Déjà Vu All Over Again: Prague Spring, Romanian Summer, and Soviet Autumn on Russia's Western Frontier". Contemporary European History. 15 (2). Cambridge University Press: 159–194. doi:10.1017/S0960777306003195. S2CID 162975402 – via Stanford University.
- Weiner, Amir (June 2006). "The Empires Pay a Visit: Gulag Returnees, East European Rebellions, and Soviet Frontier Politics". The Journal of Modern History. 78 (2). University of Chicago Press: 333–376. doi:10.1086/505800. JSTOR 10.1086/505800. S2CID 155024744 – via Stanford University.
- Weiner, Amir (2006). "Something to Die For, A Lot to Kill For: The Soviet System and the Brutalization of Warfare". In Kassimeres, George (ed.). The Barbarisation of Warfare (hardback ed.). Hurst Publishing. ISBN 9781850657996 – via Stanford University.
- Weiner, Amir (April 2008). "Robust Revolution to Retiring Revolution: The Life Cycle of the Soviet Revolution, 1945–1968". The Slavonic and East European Review. 86 (2, The Relaunch of the Soviet Project, 1945–64). Modern Humanities Research Association: 208–231. doi:10.1353/see.2008.0042. JSTOR 25479197 – via Stanford University.
- Weiner, Amir (2010). "Foreign Media and the Soviet Western Frontier: Accounts of the Hungarian and Czechoslovak Crises". In Johnson, Ross A.; Parta, Eugene R. (eds.). Cold War Broadcasting: Impact on the Soviet Union and Eastern Europe (hardcover ed.). Central European University Press. ISBN 9789639776807. JSTOR 10.7829/j.ctt1282v9 – via Stanford University.
- Rahi-Tamm, Aigi; Weiner, Amir (December 2012). "Getting to Know You: Soviet Surveillance and Its Uses, 1939–1957". Kritika: Explorations in Russian and Eurasian History. 13 (1, New Series). Slavica Publishers: 5–45. doi:10.1353/kri.2012.0011. S2CID 154566121 – via Stanford University.
