= Jean-Louis Margolin =

French academic (born 1952)

Jean-Louis Margolin (French: [ʒɑ̃ lwi maʁɡɔlɛ̃]; born 1952) is a French academic specialising in the history of eastern Asia. His positions include coordinator and lecturer in history at the University of Provence, and for the Research Institute on Southeast Asia of CNRS. Margolin's works include L'armée de l'empereur: Violences et crimes du Japon en guerre 1937-1945 (Armand Colin), which was awarded the Augustin Thierry literary prize in 2007. He was one of authors of The Black Book of Communism.
