= Karel Bartošek =

Czech-French historian (1930–2004)

Karel Bartošek (30 June 1930 – 9 July 2004) was a Czech-French historian.

== Life ==
Karel Bartošek was born on 30 June 1930 in Skuteč. He came from a working-class family, joined the Communist Party of Czechoslovakia as a young man and wrote several very tendentious pro-Communist books, most notably The Americans in Western Bohemia (1953), which dealt with the "rampage and anti-popular activities" of American soldiers (described as occupiers) in Plzeň and the surrounding area after the liberation of the region. He studied history at the Faculty of Philosophy of Charles University, became a professor there and was a member of the Czechoslovak Academy of Sciences from 1960 to 1970. His professional work focused mainly on modern Czech history.

However, he gradually broke with orthodox communism. He was prominently involved in the Prague Spring of 1968, was expelled from the Communist Party, worked as an auxiliary worker at Vodní stavby and was imprisoned for six months in 1972. In 1977, he became a signatory of Charter 77. In 1982, after the StB sent a coffin home to his family saying he was dead, he emigrated to France, where he joined the CNRS. The following year he was stripped of his Czechoslovak citizenship. In France, he was a research fellow at the Institute for Contemporary History in Paris until 1996.

In 1999, he co-authored The Black Book of Communism, which attempts to summarize the various crimes (murder, deportation, torture, etc.) committed by the authorities of communist states.

He died on 9 July 2004 in Paris.

== Publications ==
- Les sociétés, la guerre et la paix de 1911 à 1946 : Europe, Russie puis URSS, Japon, États-Unis, with Hélène Fréchet, François Boulet and Gilbert Badia.
- Les Aveux des archives. Prague-Paris-Prague, 1948–1968, Ed. du Seuil, Paris, 1996.

== Collections ==
- Edited by Stéphane Courtois, The Black Book of Communism, Éditions Robert Laffont, Paris, 1997 ISBN 978-2221082041.
- Edited by Stéphane Courtois, Le jour se lève : l'héritage du totalitarisme en Europe, 1953-2005, Mayenne, Éditions du Rocher, coll. « Démocratie ou totalitarisme », 2006, 493 p. (ISBN 978-2268057019)
- Les sociétés, la guerre et la paix de 1911 à 1946: Europe, Russie puis URSS, Japon, États-Unis,
