= Jean-Louis Panné =

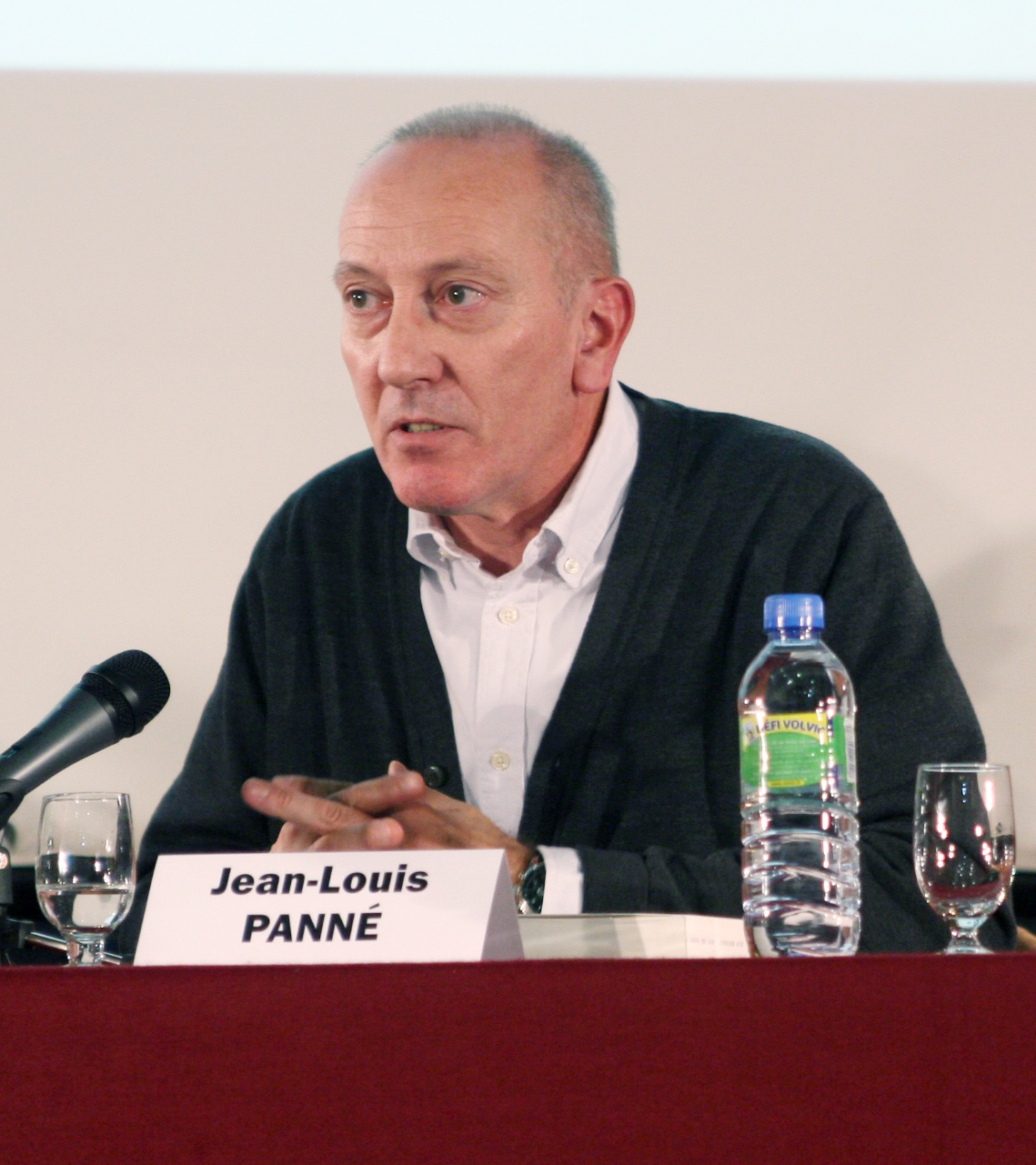
Image of Jean-Louis Panné

Jean-Louis Panné (born 12 May 1953) is a French historian and editor. He is an editor at French publisher Gallimard.

== Books ==
- Coécrit avec Emmanuel Wallon, L'Entreprise sociale, le pari autogestionnaire de Solidarność, L'Harmattan, 1987.
- Candar, Gilles (1993). Boris Souvarine : le premier désenchanté du communisme (in French). Vol. 42. Paris: Robert Laffont. p. 142. ISBN 2-221-05394-X.
- Courtois, Stéphane; Werth, Nicolas; Panné, Jean-Louis; et al. (1997). The Black Book of Communism (in French). Paris: Robert Laffont. ISBN 2-221-08204-4.
- Journal de la France et des Français. Chronologie politique, culturelle et religieuse 481-2000, années 1900-1946, Gallimard, Quarto, 2001.
- Coécrit avec Stéphane Courtois et al., Dictionnaire du communisme, Larousse, 2007, articles « Katyn », « Solidarnosc », « Dissidence », « 1956 », etc.
- Jean-Louis Panné, Jan Karski, Le roman et l'histoire, Pascal Galodé, 30/04/2010, 187 pages, ISBN 978-2355930997
- Marseillaises : 1792-2015. Textes rassemblés et présentés par Jean-Louis Panné, Paris, 2016, 98 p. Porte la mention : « Édition hors commerce réservée aux amis et aux personnes de bon aloi. » Rééd. Buchet-Chastel, 11/2018, 144 p. ISBN 978-2-283-03190-2
