= Andrzej Paczkowski =

Polish historian (1938–2026)

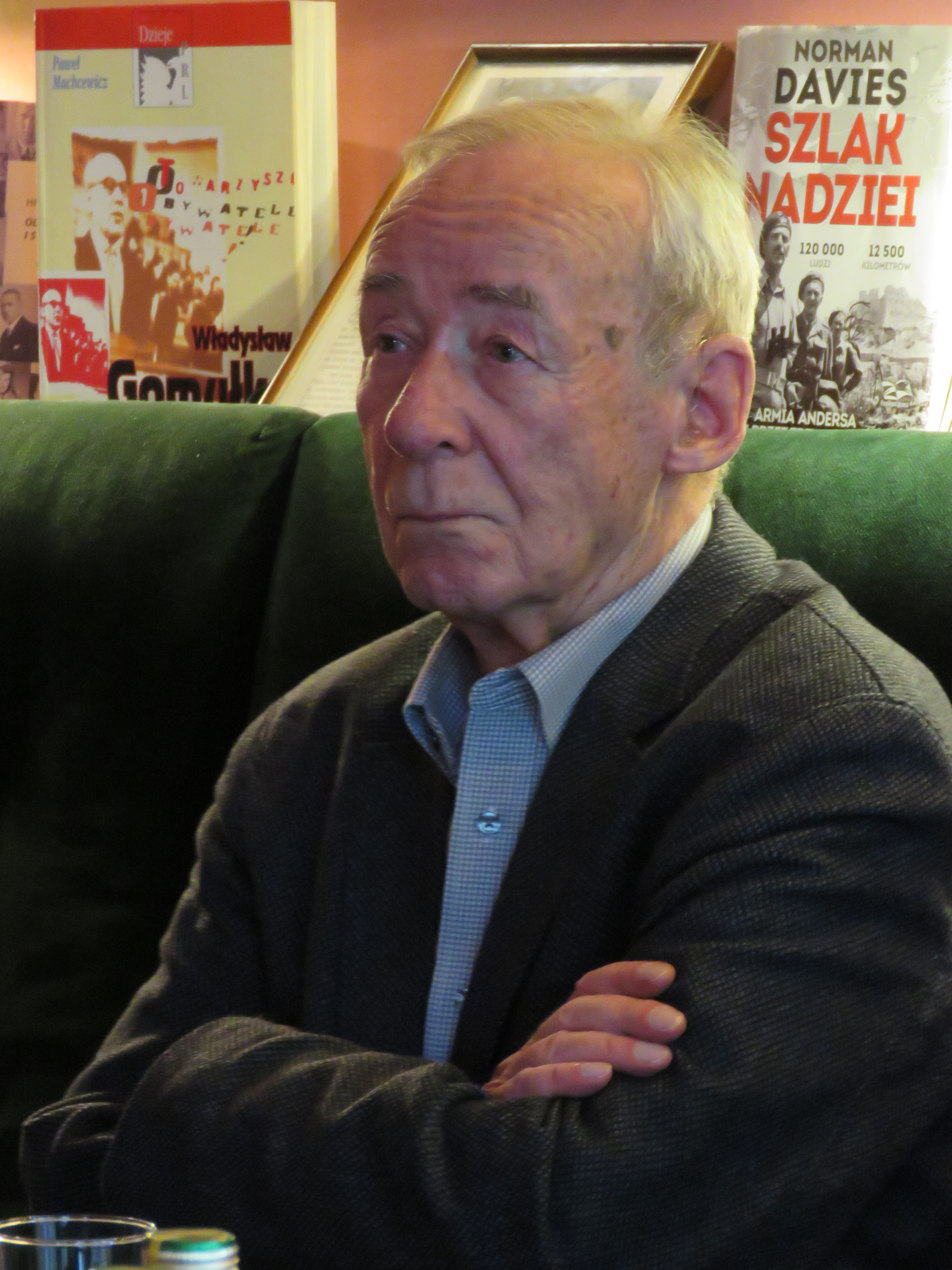
- Paczkowski in 2019
- Born: 1 October 1938; Krasnystaw, Lublin Voivodeship, Second Polish Republic
- Died: 3 January 2026 (aged 87); Habdzin, Masovian Voivodeship, Third Polish Republic
- Occupation: Historian

Andrzej Paczkowski (1 October 1938 – 3 January 2026) was a Polish historian. He was a professor at Collegium Civitas, director of Modern History Studies at the Polish Academy of Sciences, and a member of the Collegium of the Institute of National Remembrance.

== Life and career ==
Paczkowski was born in Krasnystaw on 1 October 1938, to Maria and her husband Stanisław Paczkowski.

After completing secondary school in Warsaw, he studied history at the University of Warsaw from 1955 to 1960, graduating with a master’s degree. In 1966, he defended his doctoral thesis, and in 1975 he received his habilitation.

He taught and conducted research at the Institute of Literary Research of the Polish Academy of Sciences, the National Library, and later at the Institute of Political Studies of the Polish Academy of Sciences, where he became head of the Department of Contemporary History.

Paczkowski was widely recognised for his work on the history of the Polish press, the Polish People’s Republic, and the opposition movement.

From 1974 to 1995 (for seven terms) he was a president of the Polish Mountaineering Association (Polski Związek Alpinizmu).

Paczkowski died in Warsaw on 3 January 2026, at the age of 87.

== Works ==
- Prasa polonijna w latach 1870-1939: zarys problematyki (1977)
- Prasa i społeczność polska we Francji w latach 1920-1940 (Press and the Polish Community in France 1920–1940) (1979)
- Prasa polska w latach 1918-1939 (Polish Press 1918–1939) (1980)
- Stanisław Mikołajczyk 1901-1966. Zarys biografii politycznej (1991)
- Pół wieku dziejów Polski 1939-1989 (Half Century of the History of Poland 1939–1989) (2000)
- Od sfałszowanego zwycięstwa do prawdziwej klęski: szkice do portretu PRL (1999)
- Droga do "mniejszego zła": strategia i taktyka obozu władzy; lipiec 1980 - styczeń 1982 (2001)
- Strajki, bunty, manifestacje jako "polska droga" przez socjalizm (Strikes, Revolts, Manifestations as the "Polish Way" through Socialism) (2003)
- Wojna polsko-jaruzelska (2006)
- Trzy twarze Józefa Światły: przyczynek do historii komunizmu w Polsce (2009)
