= Nicolas Werth =

French historian (born 1950)

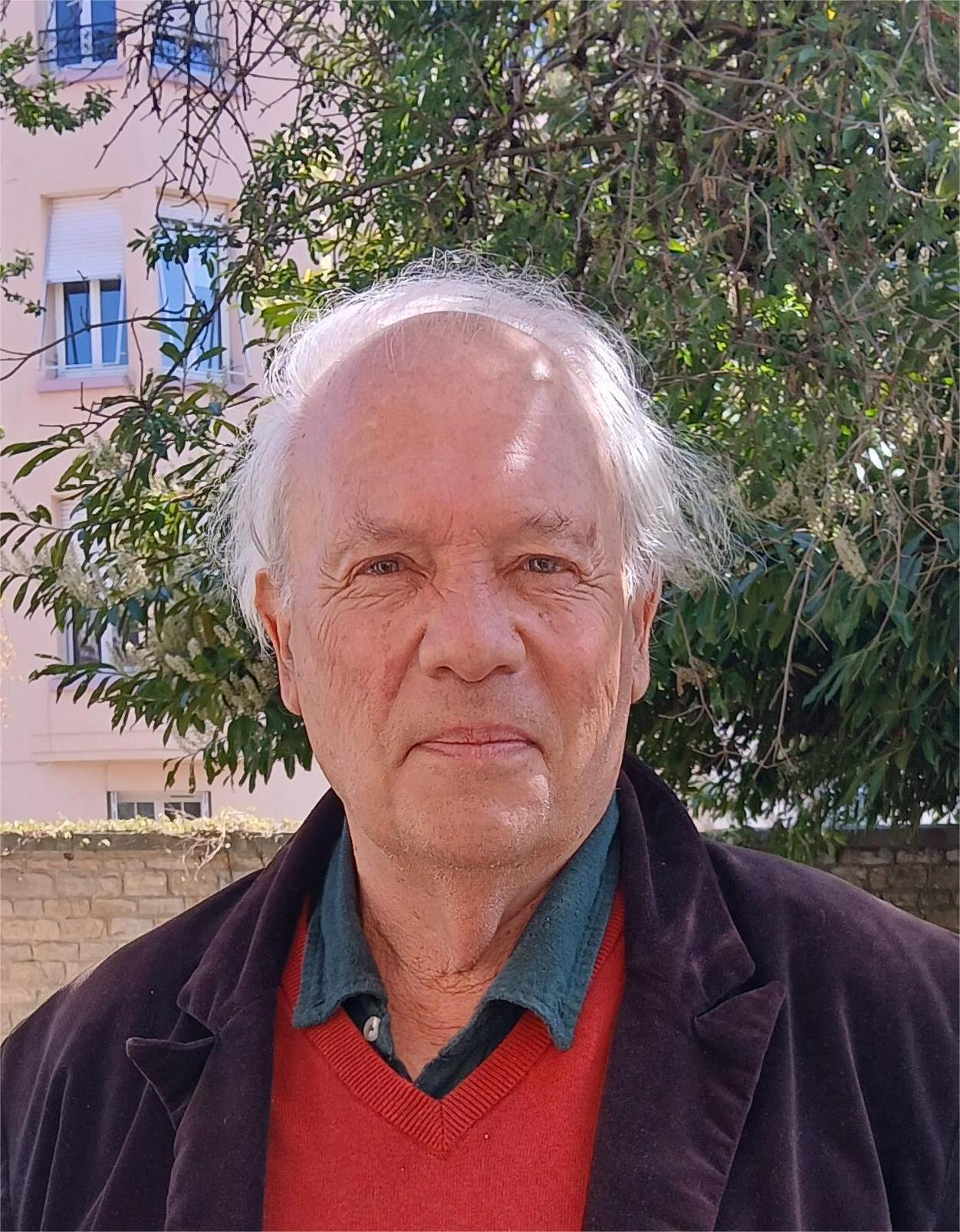
- Werth in 2025
- Born: 15 September 1950 (age 76); Paris, France
- Education: École normale supérieure
- Organization: President of Mémorial-France association
- Writing career
- Occupations: Historian; writer; researcher
- Language: French, Russian, English
- Genres: essay, research, documentary
- Notable works: Cannibal Island: Death in a Siberian Gulag; Les révolutions russes (In French)

Nicolas Werth (born 1950) is a French historian.

== Biography ==
Werth is a scholar of communist studies. He is the son of Alexander Werth, a Russian-born British journalist and writer who lived in the Soviet Union during World War II.

== Work ==
Nicolas Werth has taught abroad (Minsk, New York, Moscow, Shanghai). He served as Cultural Attaché at the French Embassy in Moscow during perestroika from 1985 to 1989. Werth joined the CNRS in 1989, where he devoted himself to History of the Soviet Union. His research has focused, among other things, on state violence and social resistance in the years 1920–1930.

He wrote the chapters dedicated to the USSR in The Black Book of Communism. He was the historic consultant for the French television documentary film, Staline: le tyran rouge, broadcast on M6 in 2007, and is co-author with Patrick Rotman and François Aymé of Gulag, The Story, broadcast on Arte in 2019.

He is President of Mémorial-France, the French branch of the Memorial society, since 2020.

== Selected bibliography ==
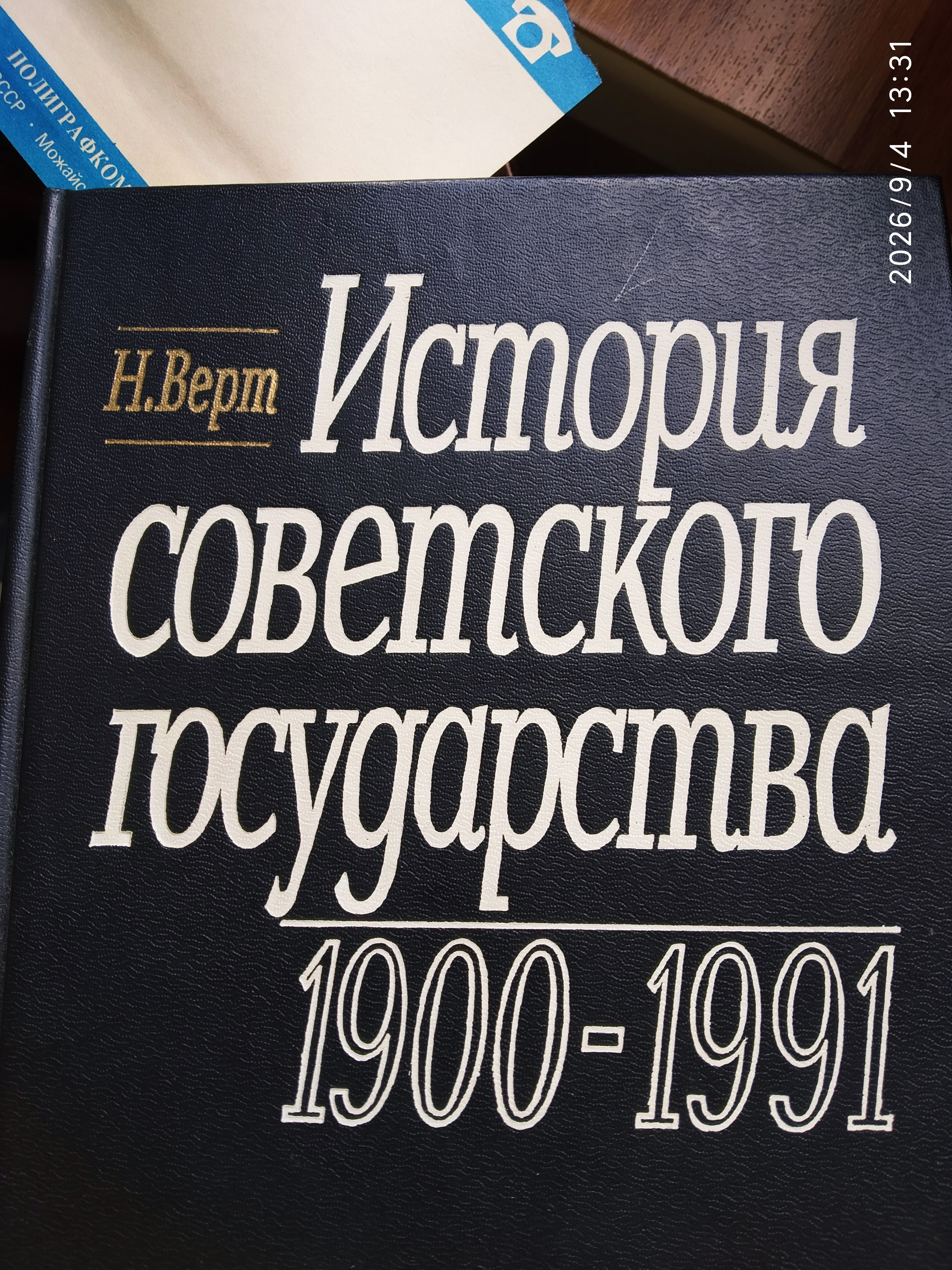
История советского государства. 1900—1991 = Histoire de l’Union Soviétique. De l’Empire russe à la CEI, 1900—1991. — М.: Прогресс, 1992. — 480 с. — 50 000 экз. — ISBN 5-01-003643-9

- Être communiste en URSS sous Staline. Paris: Gallimard, 1981.
- La Vie quotidienne des paysans russes de la Révolution à la collectivisation (1917-1939). Paris: Hachette, 1984.
- Rapports secrets soviétiques. La société russe dans les rapports confidentiels, 1921-1991. With Gaël Moullec. Paris: Gallimard, 1995.
- Histoire de l'Union soviétique de Lénine à Staline. Paris: Presses Universitaires de France, 1995.
- Histoire de l'Union soviétique de Khrouchtchev à Gorbatchev. Paris: PUF, 1998.
- 1917 : La Russie en Révolution. coll. "Découvertes Gallimard" (nº 327), Paris: Gallimard, 1998.
- "Un État contre son peuple. Violences, répressions, terreurs en URSS de 1917 à 1953," in Stéphane Courtois (ed.), Le Livre noir du communisme. Paris: Robert Laffont, 1998, pp. 45–313.
- Histoire de l'Union soviétique. De l'Empire russe à la Communauté des États indépendants, 1900-1991. 6th Edition. Paris: PUF, 2008.
- Les Procès de Moscou (1936-1938). Éditions Complexe, nouvelle édition revue et augmentée, 2006,
- Cannibal Island: Death in a Siberian Gulag, Princeton University Press, 2007, ISBN 9780691130835.
- L'Ivrogne et la marchande de fleurs : Autopsie d'un meurtre de masse, 1937-1938. Paris: Tallandier, 2009.
- La Terreur et le désarroi. Staline et son système. Paris: Perrin, 2007.
- L'Ivrogne et la marchande de fleurs : Autopsie d'un meurtre de masse, 1937–1938. Paris: Tallandier, 2009.
- L'État soviétique contre les paysans: Rapport secrets de la police politique (Tcheka, GPU, NKVD) 1918-1939. With Alexis Berelowitch. Paris: Tallandier, 2011.
- La route de la Kolyma. Paris: Editions Belin, 2012.
- Le Goulag. Témoignages et archives. Paris: Robert Laffont, collection Bouquins, 2017 (in collaboration with Luba Jurgenson).
- Les révolutions russes. Paris: PUF, 2017.
- Le cimetière de l'espérance. Essais sur l'histoire de l'Union soviétique, 1917-1991. Paris: Perrin, 2019.
- Les grandes famines soviétiques. Paris: PUF, 2020.
- Poutine historien en chef, Paris: Gallimard, collection Tracts, 2022, ISBN 9782072998096.
