= Comparison of Nazism and Stalinism =

Comparison of totalitarian ideologies

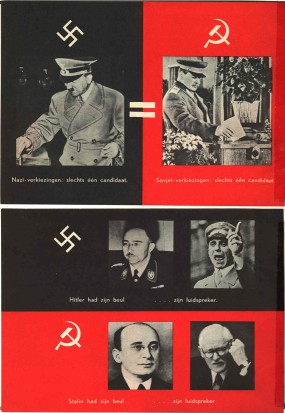
A document from the collection of Henri Max Corwin, equating propaganda images produced by Nazism with those produced by Stalinism

Various historians and other authors have carried out a comparison of Nazism and Stalinism, with particular consideration to the similarities and differences between the two ideologies and political systems, the relationship between the two regimes, and why both came to prominence simultaneously. During the 20th century, comparisons of Nazism and Stalinism were made on totalitarianism, ideology, and personality cult. Both regimes were seen in contrast to the liberal democratic Western world, emphasising the similarities between the two.

American political scientists Hannah Arendt, Zbigniew Brzezinski, and Carl Joachim Friedrich, and historian Robert Conquest were prominent advocates of applying the concept of totalitarianism to compare Nazism and Stalinism. Historians Sheila Fitzpatrick and Michael Geyer highlight the differences between Nazism and Stalinism, with Geyer saying that the idea of comparing the two regimes has achieved limited success. Historian Henry Rousso defends the work of Friedrich et al., while saying that the concept is both useful and descriptive rather than analytical, and positing that the regimes described as totalitarian do not have a common origin and did not arise in similar ways. Historians Philippe Burrin and Nicolas Werth take a middle position between one making the leader seem all-powerful and the other making him seem like a weak dictator. Historians Ian Kershaw and Moshe Lewin take a longer historical perspective and regard Nazism and Stalinism not as examples of a new type of society but as historical anomalies and dispute whether grouping them as totalitarian is useful.

Other historians and political scientists have made comparisons between Nazism and Stalinism as part of their work. The comparison has long provoked political controversy, and in the 1980s led to the historians' dispute within Germany known as the Historikerstreit.

== Hannah Arendt ==
=== Origins of totalitarianism ===
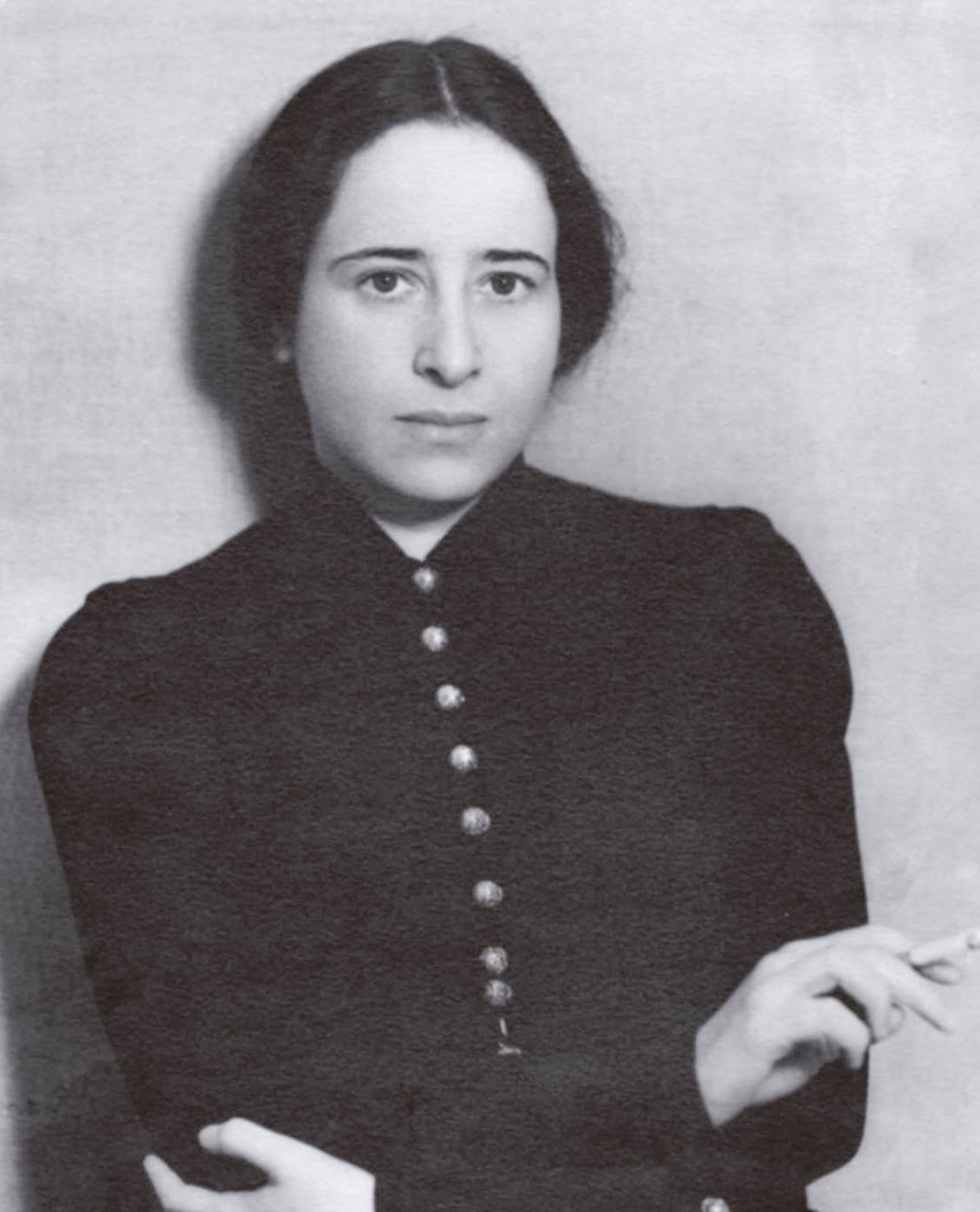
Hannah Arendt in 1933

Hannah Arendt was one of the first scholars to publish a comparative study of Adolf Hitler and Joseph Stalin. In her 1951 work The Origins of Totalitarianism, Arendt puts forward the idea of totalitarianism as a distinct type of political movement and form of government, which "differs essentially from other forms of political oppression known to us, such as despotism, tyranny, and dictatorship." Arendt distinguishes between a totalitarian movement, such as a political party with totalitarian aims, and a totalitarian government. Not all totalitarian movements succeed in creating totalitarian governments once they gain power. In Arendt's view, although many totalitarian movements existed in Europe in the 1920s and 1930s, only the governments of Stalin and Hitler succeeded in fully implementing their totalitarian aims.

Arendt traced the origin of totalitarian movements to the 19th century, focusing especially on antisemitism and New Imperialism. She emphasised the connection between the rise of European nation states and the growth of antisemitism, which was because the Jews represented an "inter-European, non-national element in a world of growing or existing nations." Conspiracy theories abounded, and the Jews were accused of being part of various international schemes to ruin European nations. Small antisemitic political parties formed in response to this perceived Jewish threat. According to Arendt, these were the first political organisations in Europe that claimed to represent the interests of the whole nation instead of the interests of a class or other social group.

European imperialism of the 19th century, better known as New Imperialism, also paved the way for totalitarianism by legitimising the concept of endless expansion. After Europeans had engaged in imperialist expansion on other continents, political movements developed which aimed to copy the methods of imperialism on the European continent itself. Arendt refers specifically to the pan-movements of pan-Germanism and pan-Slavism, which promised continental empires to nations with little hope of overseas expansion. According to Arendt, "Nazism and Bolshevism owe more to Pan-Germanism and Pan-Slavism (respectively) than to any other ideology or political movement."

=== Recruitment, propaganda, and indoctrination ===
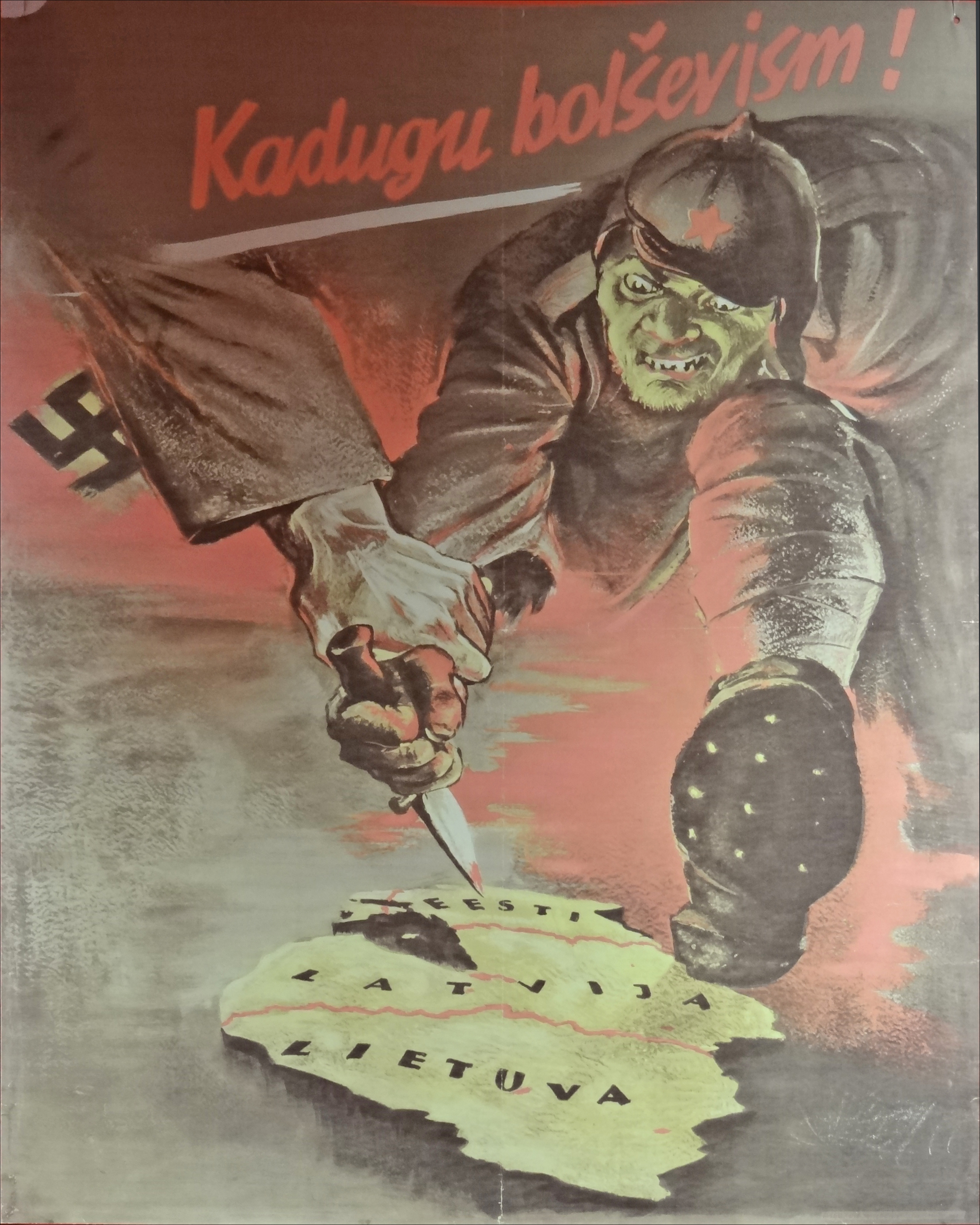
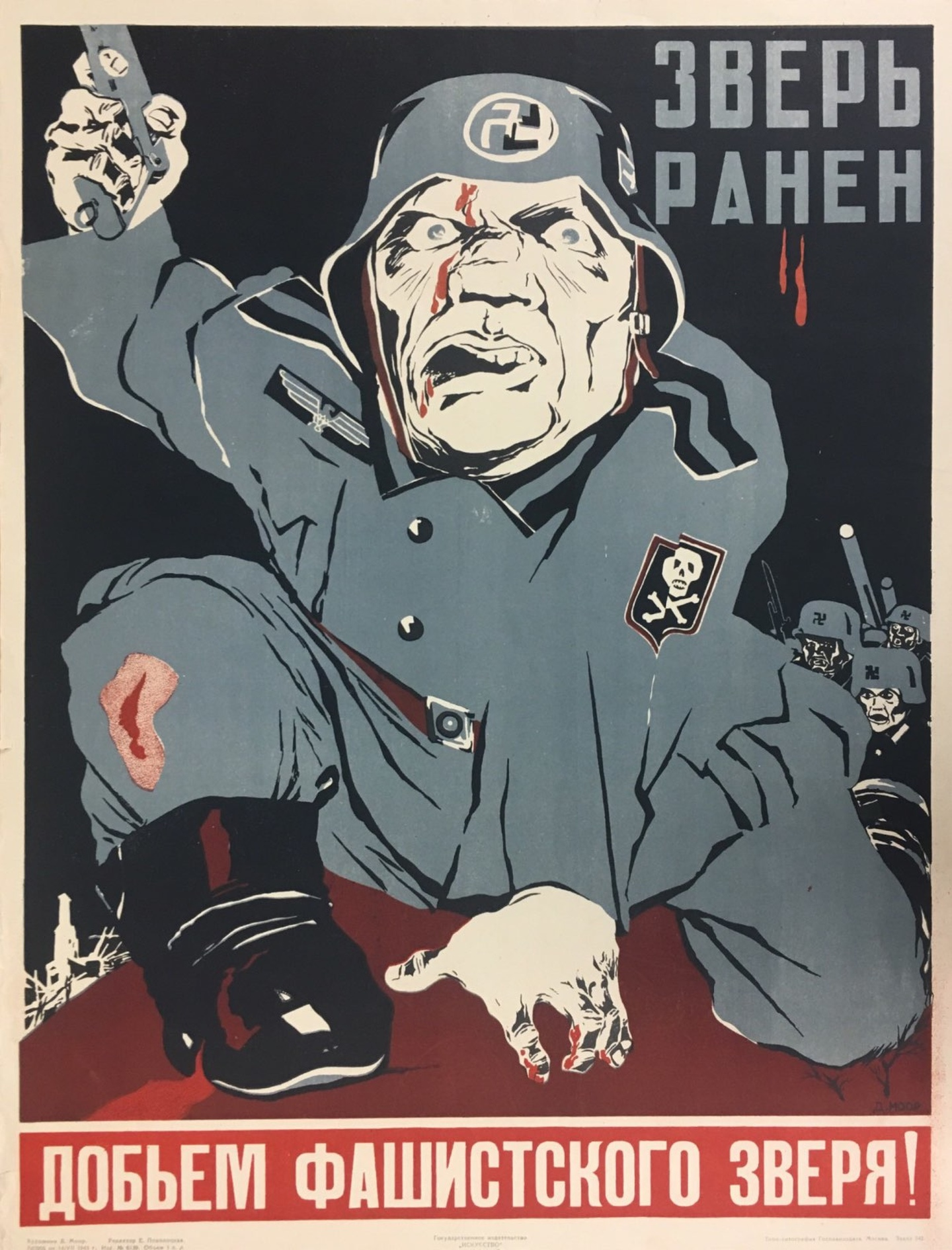
Demonizing the enemy was an important part of the propaganda on both sides, which greatly contributed to mutual hatred, anti-Russian sentiment, and anti-German sentiment.

Arendt posits that both the Nazi and Bolshevik movements "recruited their members from mass of apparently indifferent people whom all other parties had given up", and who "had reason to be equally hostile to all parties." For this reason, totalitarian movements did not need to use debate or persuasion, and did not need to refute other parties' arguments. Their target audience did not have to be persuaded to despise the other parties or the democratic system, because it consisted of people who already despised mainstream politics. As a result, totalitarian movements were free to use violence and terror against their opponents without fear that this might alienate their own supporters. Instead of arguing against their opponents, they adopted deterministic views of human behaviour. They presented opposing ideas as "originating in deep natural, social, or psychological sources beyond the control of the individual and therefore beyond the power of reason." The Nazis in particular, during the years before their rise to power, engaged in "killing small socialist functionaries or influential members of opposing parties" both as a means to intimidate opponents and as a means of demonstrating to their supporters that they were a party of action, "different from the 'idle talkers' of other parties."

Totalitarian governments make extensive use of propaganda and are often characterised by having a substantial distinction between what they tell their own supporters and the propaganda they produce for others. Arendt distinguishes these two categories as "indoctrination" and "propaganda". Indoctrination consists of the message that a totalitarian government promotes internally to the members of the ruling party and that segment of the population that supports the government. Propaganda consists of the message that a totalitarian government seeks to promote in the outside world and among parts of its own society that may not support the government. According to Arendt, "the necessities for propaganda are always dictated by the outside world", while the opportunities for indoctrination depend on "the totalitarian governments' isolation and security from outside interference."

The indoctrination used by the Soviets and the Nazis was characterised by claims of "scientific" truth and appeals to "objective laws of nature." Both movements took a deterministic view of human society, and stressed that their ideologies were based on scientific discoveries regarding race (in the case of the Nazis) or the forces governing human history (in the case of the Soviets). Arendt identifies this as being in specific ways similar to modern advertising, in which companies claim that scientific research shows their products to be superior; however, she posits more generally that it is an extreme version of "that obsession with science which has characterised the Western world since the rise of mathematics and physics in the sixteenth century." By using pseudoscience as the primary justification for their actions, Nazism and Stalinism are distinguished from earlier historical despotic regimes, who appealed instead to religion or sometimes did not try to justify themselves at all. According to Arendt, totalitarian governments did not merely use these appeals to supposed scientific laws as propaganda to manipulate others. Totalitarian leaders like Hitler and Stalin genuinely believed that they were acting in accordance with immutable natural laws, to such an extent that they were willing to sacrifice the self-interest of their regimes for the sake of enacting those supposed laws. The Nazis treated the inhabitants of occupied territories with extreme brutality. They planned to depopulate Eastern Europe to make way for colonists from the German Herrenvolk ("master race"), even though this actively harmed their war effort. Stalin repeatedly engaged in purges of the Communist Party of the Soviet Union of people who deviated even slightly from the party line, even when this weakened the party or the Soviet government, because he believed that they represented the interests of "dying classes" and that their demise was historically inevitable.

=== Leader ===
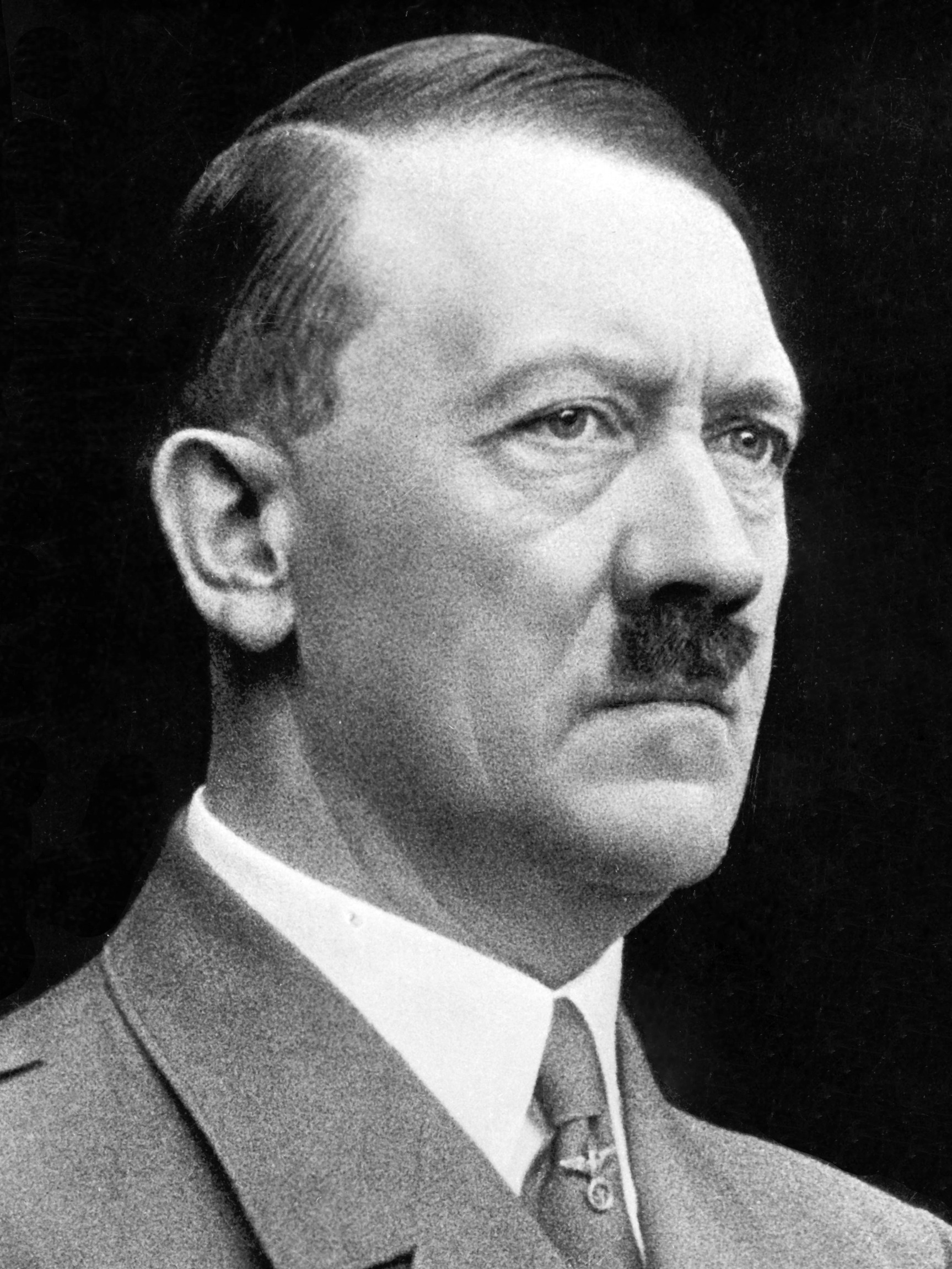
Adolf Hitler, leader of Nazi Germany from 1933 to 1945

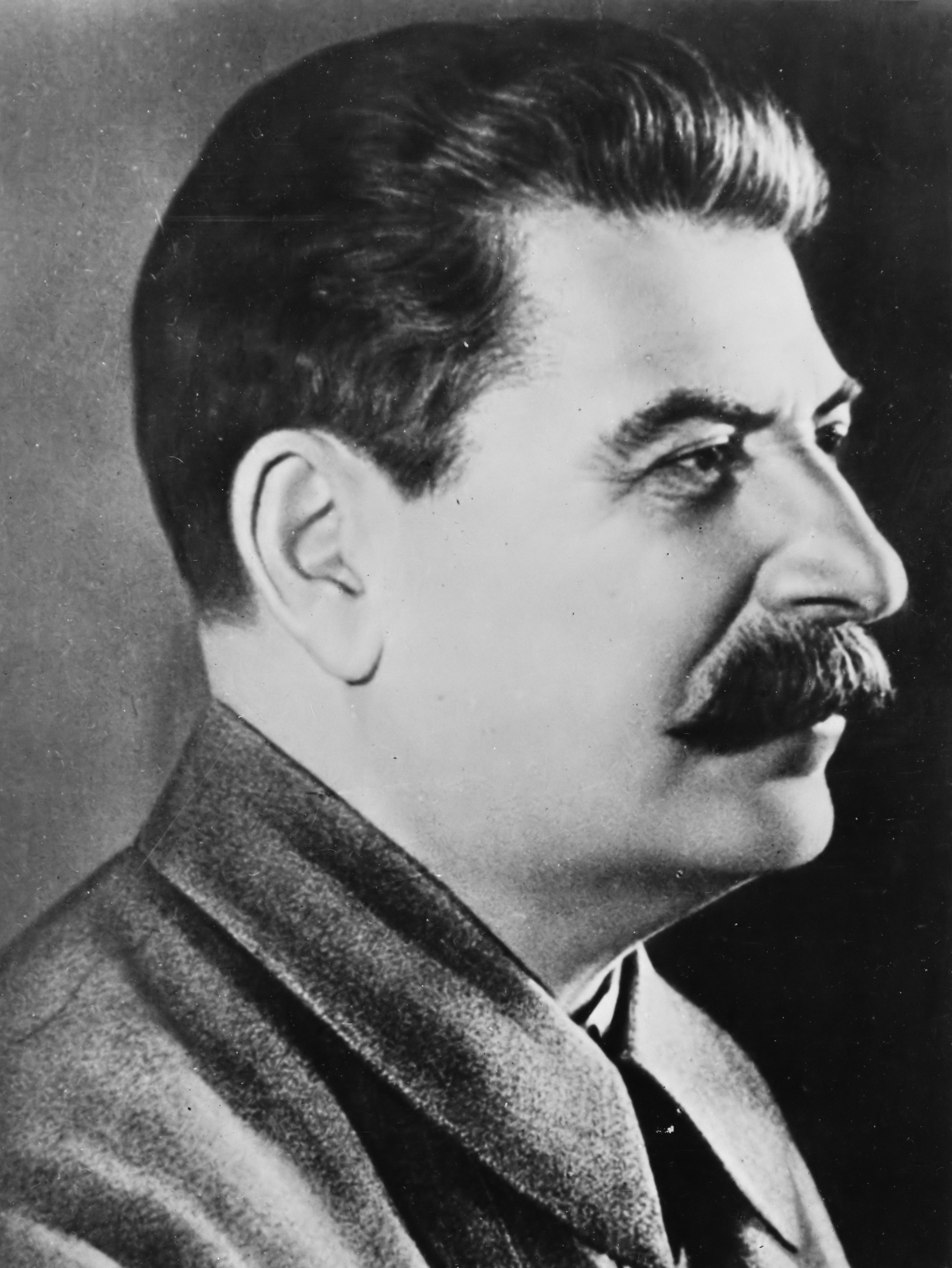
Joseph Stalin, leader of the Soviet Union from 1924 to 1953

Arendt also identifies the central importance of an all-powerful leader in totalitarian movements. She distinguishes between totalitarian leaders like Hitler and Stalin and non-totalitarian dictators or autocratic leaders. The totalitarian leader does not rise to power by personally using violence or through any special organisational skills but by controlling personnel appointments within the party so that all other prominent party members owe their positions to him. With loyalty to the leader becoming the primary criterion for promotion, ambitious party members compete with each other in trying to express their loyalty, and a cult of personality develops around the leader. Even when the leader is not particularly competent and the members of his inner circle are aware of his deficiencies, they remain committed to him out of fear that the entire power structure would collapse without him.

=== "Enemies" ===
Once in power, according to Arendt, totalitarian movements face a major dilemma: they built their support based on anger against the status quo and on impossible or dishonest promises, but now they have become the new status quo and are expected to carry out their promises. They deal with this problem by engaging in a constant struggle against external and internal enemies, real or imagined, to enable them to say that, in a sense, they have not yet gained the power they need to fulfil their promises. According to Arendt, totalitarian governments must constantly be fighting enemies in order to survive. This explains their irrational behaviour, such as when Hitler continued to make territorial demands even after he was offered everything he asked for in the Munich Agreement, or when Stalin unleashed the Great Terror even when there was no longer any serious opposition to him.

=== Internment camps ===
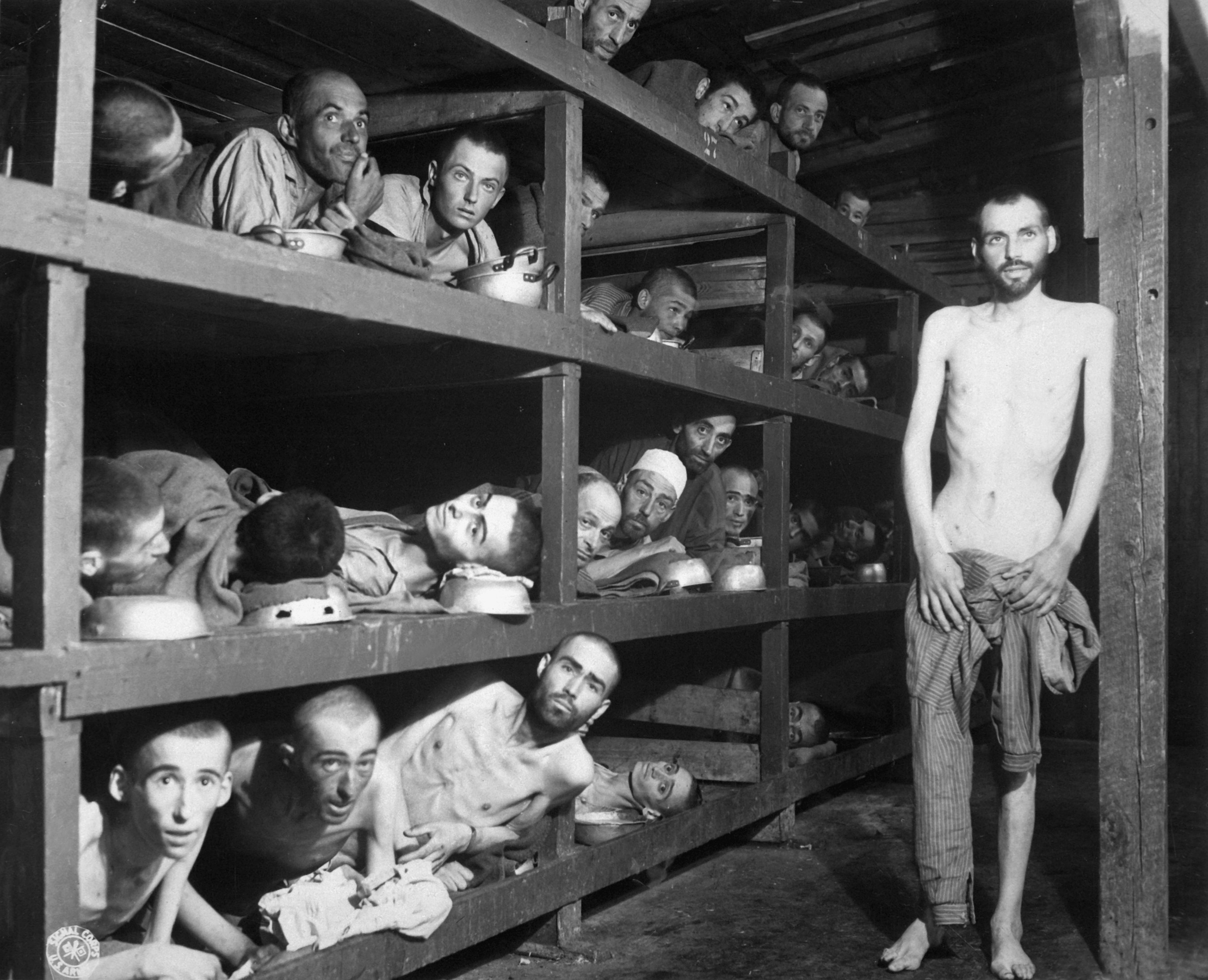
Slave labourers in the Nazi Buchenwald concentration camp

Arendt highlights the widespread use of internment camps by totalitarian governments, positing that they are the most important manifestation of the need to find enemies to fight against, and therefore they are "more essential to the preservation of the regime's power than any of its other institutions." Although forced labour was commonly imposed on inmates of Nazi concentration camps, Arendt argues that material gain for the regime was not their primary purpose because "[t]he only permanent economic function of the camps has been the financing of their own supervisory apparatus; from the economic point of view, the concentration camps exist mostly for their own sake." In particular, the Nazis carried this logic to the point of "open anti-utility" by expending large sums of money, resources, and manpower during a war for the purpose of building and staffing extermination camps and transporting people to them. This sets apart the concentration camps of totalitarian regimes from older human institutions that bear some similarity to them, such as slavery. Slaves were abused and killed for the sake of profit; concentration camp inmates were abused and killed because a totalitarian government needed to justify its existence. Finally, Arendt points out that concentration camps under both Hitler and Stalin included large numbers of inmates who were innocent of any crime not only in the ordinary sense of the word but even by the standards of the regimes themselves; that is to say, most of the inmates had not committed any action against the regime.

=== Future of totalitarian systems ===
Throughout her analysis, Arendt emphasised the modernity and novelty of the governmental structures set up by Stalin and Hitler, arguing that they represented "an entirely new form of government" which is likely to manifest itself again in various other forms in the future. She also cautioned against the belief that future totalitarian movements would necessarily share the ideological foundations of Nazism or Stalinism, writing that "all ideologies contain totalitarian elements."

== Carl Friedrich and Zbigniew Brzezinski ==
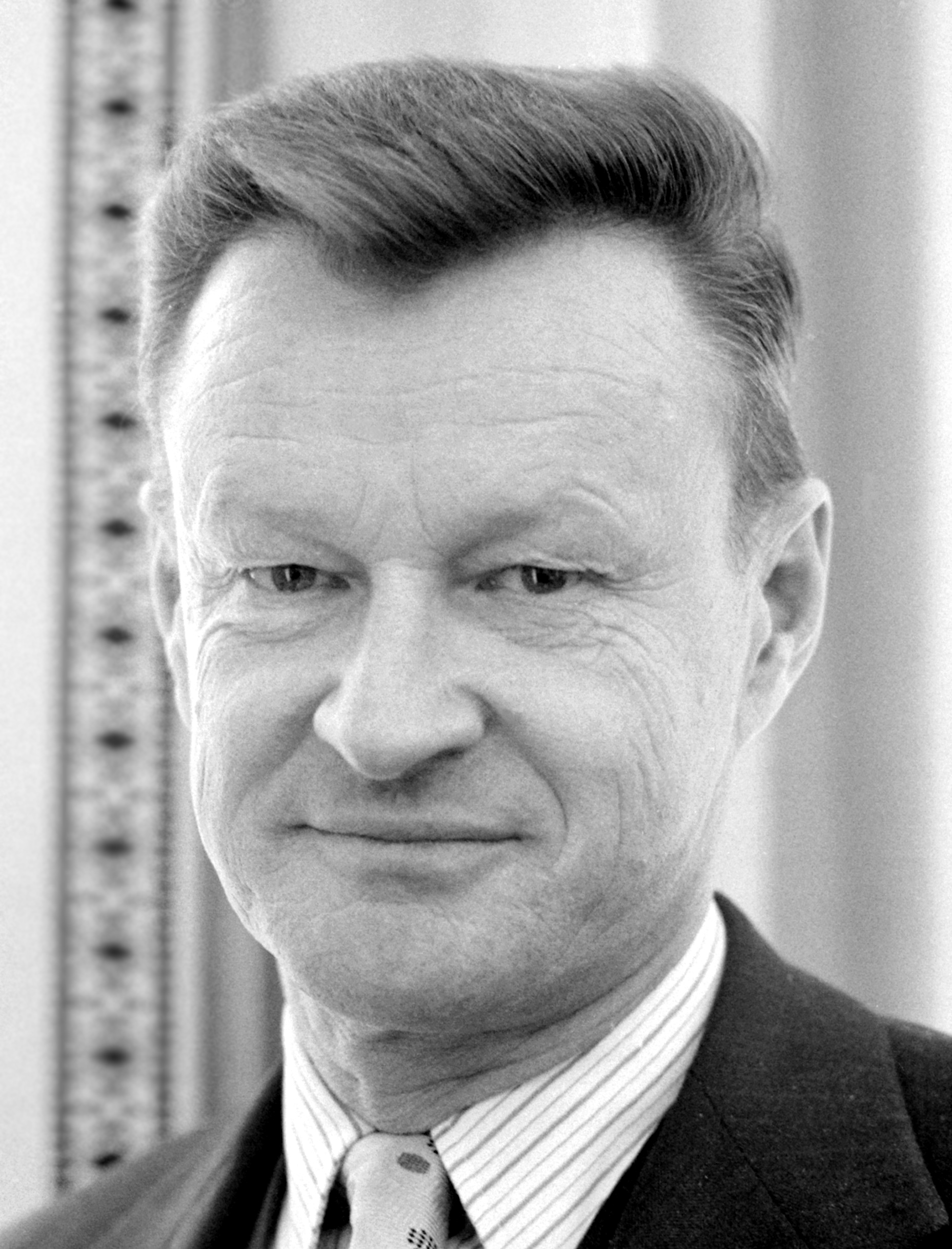
Zbigniew Brzezinski

=== Totalitarian systems and autocracies ===
The totalitarian paradigm in the comparative study of Nazi Germany and the Soviet Union was further developed by Carl Friedrich and Zbigniew Brzezinski, who wrote extensively on this topic both individually and in collaboration. Similar to Arendt, they state that "totalitarian dictatorship is a new phenomenon; there has never been anything quite like it before." Friedrich and Brzezinski classify totalitarian dictatorship as a type of autocracy but state that it is different in important ways from most other historical autocracies. In particular, it is distinguished by a reliance on modern technology and mass legitimation.

Unlike Arendt, Friedrich and Brzezinski apply the notion of totalitarian dictatorship not only to the regimes of Hitler and Stalin but also to the Soviet Union throughout its entire existence as well as the regime of Benito Mussolini in Italy and the People's Republic of China under Mao Zedong. Friedrich stated that the "possibility of equating the dictatorship of Stalin in the Soviet Union and that of Hitler in Germany" has been a deeply controversial topic and a subject of debate almost from the beginning of those dictatorships. Various other aspects of the two regimes have also been the subject of intense scholarly debate, such as whether Nazi and Stalinist ideologies were genuinely believed and pursued by the respective governments, or whether the ideologies were merely convenient justifications for dictatorial rule.

Friedrich and Brzezinski posit that Nazism and Stalinism are not only similar to each other, but also represent a continuation or a return to the tradition of European absolute monarchy on certain levels. In the absolute monarchies of the seventeenth and eighteenth centuries, the monarch ultimately held all decisional power and was considered accountable only to God. In Stalinism and Nazism, the leader likewise held all real power and was considered accountable only to various intangible entities, such as "the people", "the masses", or "the Volk"; the common feature of autocracies, whether monarchical or totalitarian, is the concentration of power in the hands of a leader who cannot be held accountable by any legal mechanisms, and who is supposed to be the embodiment of the will of an abstract entity. Friedrich and Brzezinski also identify other features common to all autocracies, such as "the oscillation between tight and loose control." The regime alternates between periods of intense repression and relative freedom, often represented by different leaders, and this depends in part on the personal character of different leaders. Friedrich and Brzezinski believe that there is also an underlying political cycle in which rising discontent leads to increased repression until the opposition is eliminated. Controls are relaxed until the next time that popular dissatisfaction begins to grow.

Placing Stalinism and Nazism within the broader historical tradition of autocratic government, Friedrich and Brzezinski hold that "totalitarian dictatorship, in a sense, is the adaptation of autocracy to twentieth-century industrial society." At the same time, they insist that totalitarian dictatorship is a "novel type of autocracy". They posit that 20th-century totalitarian regimes, such as those of Hitler and Stalin, had more in common with each other than with any other form of government, including historical autocracies of the past. Totalitarianism can only exist after the creation of modern technology, because such technology is essential for propaganda, surveillance of the population, and the operation of the secret police. When speaking of the differences and similarities between fascist and communist regimes, Friedrich and Brzezinski insist that the two kinds of totalitarian governments are "basically alike" but "not wholly alike" in that they are more similar to each other than to other forms of government, but they are not the same. Among the major differences between them, Friedrich and Brzezinski particularly identify that communists seek "the world revolution of the proletariat". Meanwhile, fascists wish to "establish the imperial predominance of a particular nation or race."

=== Five pillars of totalitarian systems ===
In terms of the similarities between Nazism and Stalinism, Friedrich lists five main aspects that they hold in common: First, an official ideology that is supposed to be followed by all members of society, at least passively, and which promises to serve as a perfect guide towards some ultimate goal. Second, a single political party, composed of the most enthusiastic supporters of the official ideology, representing an elite group within society (no more than 10 per cent of the population), and organised along strictly regimented lines. Third, "a technologically conditioned near-complete monopoly of control of all means of effective armed combat" in the hands of the party or its representatives. Fourth, a similar monopoly held by the party over the mass media and all technological forms of communication. Fifth, "a system of terroristic police control" that is not only used to defend the regime against actual enemies, but also to persecute various groups of people who are only suspected of being enemies or who may potentially become enemies in the future.

According to Friedrich and Brzezinski, the two first pillars of any totalitarian government are the dictator and the party. The dictator, whether Stalin, Hitler, or Mussolini, holds absolute power. Friedrich and Brzezinski explicitly reject the claim that the party, or any other institution, could provide a significant counterweight to the dictator's power in Nazism or Stalinism. The dictator needs the party in order to be able to rule, so he may be careful not to make decisions that would go directly against the wishes of other leading party members, but ultimate authority rests with him and not with them. Like Arendt, Friedrich and Brzezinski also identify the cult of personality surrounding the leader as an essential element of a totalitarian dictatorship and reference Stalin's personality cult in particular. They also draw attention to how Hitler and Stalin were expected to provide ideological direction for their governments and not merely practical leadership. Friedrich and Brzezinski write that "unlike military dictators in the past, but like certain types of primitive chieftains, the totalitarian dictator is both ruler and high priest." That is to say, he not only governs, but also provides the principles on which his government is to be based. This is partly due to the way that totalitarian governments arise. They come about when a militant ideological movement seizes power, so the first leader of a totalitarian government is usually the ideologue who built the movement that seized power, and subsequent leaders try to emulate him.

==== Dictator and his henchmen ====
The totalitarian dictator needs loyal lieutenants to carry out his orders faithfully and with a reasonable degree of efficiency. Friedrich and Brzezinski identify parallels between the men in Hitler and Stalin's entourage, arguing that both dictators turned to similar people to perform similar tasks. Martin Bormann and Georgy Malenkov were both capable managers and bureaucrats. Heinrich Himmler and Lavrentiy Beria were ruthless secret police chiefs responsible for suppressing any potential challenge to the dictator's power. Both Hitler and Stalin promoted rivalry and distrust among their trusted men to ensure that none of them would become powerful enough to challenge the dictator himself. This is the cause of an important weakness of the totalitarian regimes: the problem of succession. Friedrich points out that neither the Nazi nor the Stalinist government established any official line of succession or mechanism to decide who would replace the dictator after his death. The dictator, being the venerated "father of the people", was regarded as irreplaceable. There could never be any heir apparent because such an heir would have been a threat to the dictator's power while he was alive; the dictator's inevitable death would always leave behind a major power vacuum and cause a political crisis. In the case of the Nazi regime, since Hitler died mere days before the final defeat of Germany in the war, this never became a major issue; in the case of the Soviet Union, Stalin's death led to a prolonged power struggle.

==== Totalitarian party ====
Friedrich and Brzezinski also identify critical similarities between the Nazi and Stalinist political parties, which set them apart from other types of political parties. Both the Nazi Party and the All-Union Communist Party (Bolsheviks) under Stalin had stringent membership requirements and did not accept members based on mere agreement with the party's ideology and goals; they strictly tested potential members in a manner similar to exclusive clubs, and often engaged in political purges of the membership, expelling large numbers of people from their ranks, and sometimes arresting and executing those expelled, such as in the Great Purge or the Night of the Long Knives. The totalitarian party cultivates the idea that to be a member is a privilege that needs to be earned, and total obedience to the leader is required to maintain this privilege. While both Nazism and Stalinism required party members to display such total loyalty in practice, they differed in how they dealt with it in theory. Nazism openly proclaimed the hierarchical ideal of absolute obedience to the Führer and the Führerprinzip as one of its key ideological principles. Stalinism denied that it did anything similar and proclaimed to uphold democratic principles, with the party congress made up of elected delegates supposedly being the highest authority. Stalinist elections typically featured only a single candidate, and the party congress met very rarely and always approved Stalin's decisions. Regardless of the differences in their underlying ideological claims, the Nazi and Stalinist parties were organised in practice along similar lines, with a rigid hierarchy and centralised leadership.

Each totalitarian party and dictator is supported by a specific totalitarian ideology. Friedrich and Brzezinski agree with Arendt that Nazi and Stalinist leaders really believed in their respective ideologies and did not merely use them as tools to gain power. Several major policies, such as the Stalinist collectivisation in the Soviet Union of agriculture or the Nazi Final Solution, cannot be explained by anything other than a genuine commitment to achieving ideological goals, even at great cost. The ideologies and their goals were different, but they had in common a utopian commitment to reshaping the world and a determination to fight by any means necessary against a real or imagined enemy. This stereotyped enemy could be described as "the fat rich Jew or the Jewish Bolshevik" for the Nazis, or "the war-mongering, atom-bomb-wielding American Wallstreeter" for the Soviets.

==== Ideology and symbolism ====
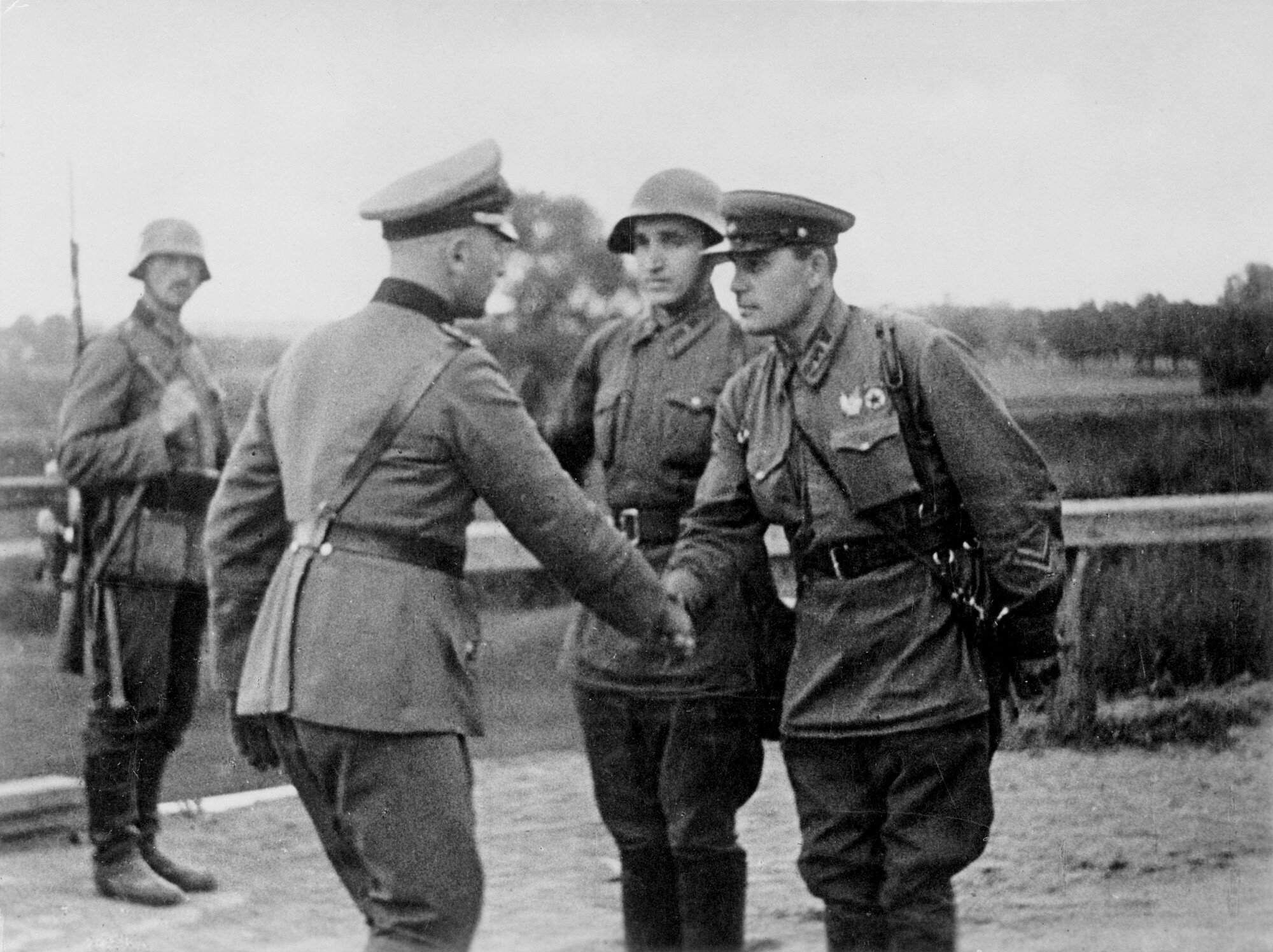
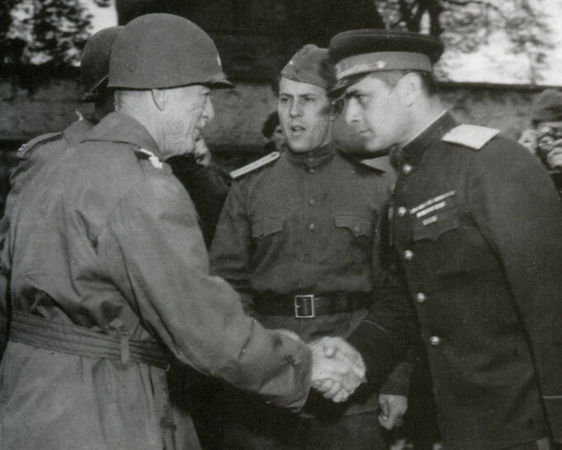
Shown left is a rendezvous of Soviet and German forces during the occupation of Poland in 1939, while shown right is the meeting of Soviet and U.S. forces on Elbe Day in 1945, highlighting an upside-down reverse of enemy—ally in Soviet propaganda

According to Friedrich and Brzezinski, the most important difference between Nazi and Stalinist ideology lies in the degree of universality involved. Stalinism, and communist ideology in general, is universal in its appeal and addresses itself to all the "workers of the world." Nazism, on the other hand, and fascist ideology in general, can only address itself to one particular race or nation, i.e. the "master race" that is destined to dominate all others. Therefore, "in communism social justice appears to be the ultimate value, unless it be the classless society that is its essential condition; in fascism, the highest value is dominion, eventually world dominion, and the strong and pure nation-race is its essential condition, as seen by its ideology." This means that fascist or Nazi movements from different countries will be natural enemies rather than natural allies, as they each seek to extend the dominion of their own nation at the expense of others.

Friedrich and Brzezinski also draw attention to the symbols used by Nazis and Stalinists to represent themselves. The Soviet Union adopted the hammer and sickle, a newly created symbol "invented by the leaders of the movement and pointing to the future." Meanwhile, Nazi Germany used the swastika, "a ritual symbol of uncertain origin, quite common in primitive societies." One is trying to project itself as being oriented towards a radically new future, while the other is appealing to a mythical heroic past.

==== Propaganda and terror ====
Totalitarian dictatorships maintain power through propaganda and terror, which Friedrich and Brzezinski believe to be closely connected. Terror may be enforced with arrests and executions of dissenters but can also take more subtle forms, such as the threat of losing one's job, social stigma and defamation. "Terror" can refer to any widespread method used to intimidate people into submission as a matter of daily life. According to Friedrich and Brzezinski, the most effective terror is invisible to the people it affects. They develop a habit of conforming and not questioning authority, without necessarily being aware that this is what they are doing. Terror creates a society dominated by apparent consensus, where the vast majority of the population appears to support the government. Propaganda is then used to maintain this appearance of popular consent.

Totalitarian propaganda is one of the features that distinguishes totalitarian regimes as modern forms of government. It separates them from older autocracies, since a totalitarian government holds complete control over all means of communication, not only public communication such as the mass media but also private communication such as letters and telephone calls, which are strictly monitored. The methods of propaganda were very similar in the Stalinist Soviet Union and Nazi Germany. Both Joseph Goebbels and Soviet propagandists sought to demonize their enemies and present a picture of a united people standing behind their leader to confront foreign threats. In both cases, there was no attempt to convey complex ideological nuances to the masses, with the message being instead about a simplistic struggle between good and evil. Both Nazi and Stalinist regimes produced two very different sets of propaganda, one for internal consumption and one for potential sympathisers in other countries. Moreover, both regimes would sometimes radically change their propaganda line as they made peace with a former enemy or got into a war with a former ally.

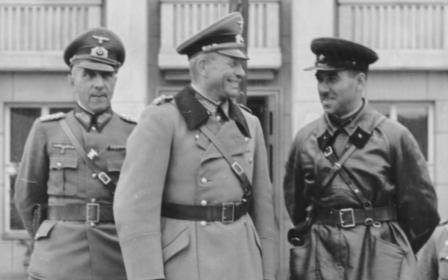
Generals Heinz Guderian and Semyon Krivoshein at the joint German–Soviet military parade in Brest-Litovsk after the Fourth Partition of Poland and before the former allies' eventual split

Paradoxically, a totalitarian government's complete control over communications renders that government highly misinformed. With no way for anyone to express criticism, the dictator has no way of knowing how much support he has among the general populace. With all government policies always declared successful in propaganda, officials cannot determine what worked and what did not. Both Stalinism and Nazism suffered from this problem, especially during the war between them. As the war turned against Germany, there was growing opposition to Hitler's rule, including within the ranks of the military, but Hitler was never aware of this until it was too late, such as with the 20 July plot. During the early days of the Berlin Blockade in 1948, the Soviet leadership apparently believed that the population of West Berlin was sympathetic to Soviet communism and that they would request to join the Soviet zone. Given enough time, the gap between genuine public opinion and what the totalitarian government believes about public opinion can grow so vast that the government is no longer able to even produce effective propaganda, because it does not know what the people think and so it does not know what to tell them. Friedrich and Brzezinski refer to this as the "ritualization of propaganda": the totalitarian regime continues to produce propaganda as a political ritual, with little real impact on public opinion.

==== Arrests, executions, and concentration camps ====
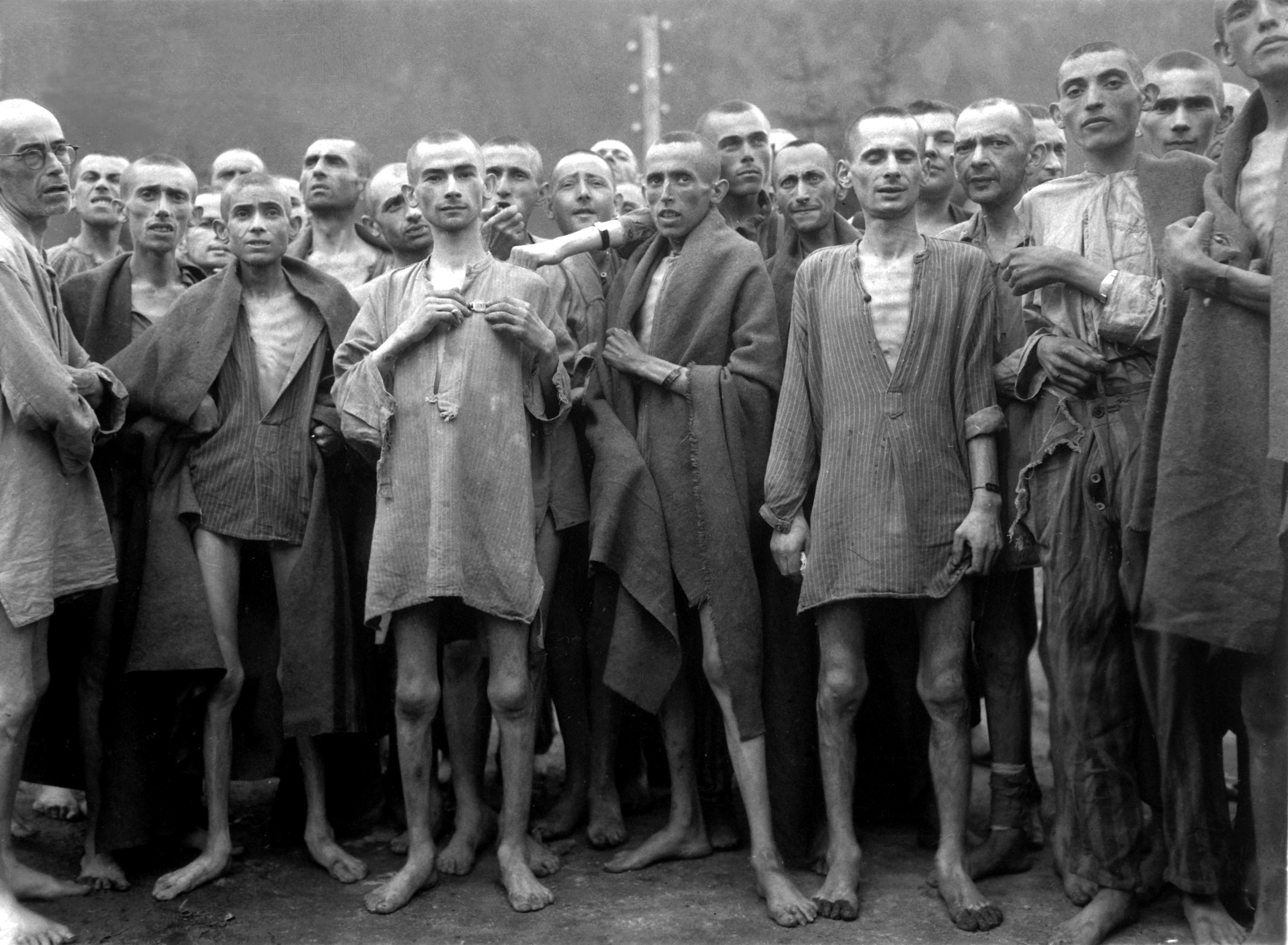
Emaciated survivors of Ebensee concentration camp, May 1945

The totalitarian use of mass arrests, executions, and concentration camps was analysed at length by Friedrich and Brzezinski. They hold that "totalitarian terror maintains, in institutionalized form, the civil war that originally produced the totalitarian movement and by means of which the regime is able to proceed with its program, first of social disintegration and then of social reconstruction." Both Stalinism and Nazism saw themselves as engaging in a life-or-death struggle against implacable enemies; however, to declare that the struggle had been won would have meant to declare that most of the totalitarian features of the government were no longer needed. A secret police force has no reason to exist if there are no dangerous traitors who need to be found. The struggle, or civil war against internal enemies, must be institutionalised and must continue indefinitely. In the Stalinist Soviet Union, the repressive apparatus was eventually turned against members of the Communist Party itself in the Great Purge and the show trials that accompanied it. By contrast, Nazism had a much shorter lifespan in power, and Nazi terror generally maintained an outward focus, with the extermination of the Jews always given top priority. The Nazis did not turn inward towards purging their own party except in a limited way on two occasions (the Night of the Long Knives and the aftermath of the 20 July plot).

The peak of totalitarian terror was reached with the Nazi concentration camps. These ranged from labour camps to extermination camps, and Friedrich and Brzezinski describe them as aiming to "eliminate all actual, potential, and imagined enemies of the regime." As the field of Holocaust studies was still in its early stages at the time of their writing, they do not describe the conditions in detail, but do refer to the camps as involving "extreme viciousness." They also compare these camps with the Soviet Gulag system and highlight concentration camps as a method of punishment and execution by Nazi and Stalinist regimes alike. Unlike Hannah Arendt, who held that the Gulag camps served no economic purpose, Friedrich and Brzezinski posit that they provided an important source of cheap labor for the Stalinist economy.

== Moshe Lewin and Ian Kershaw ==
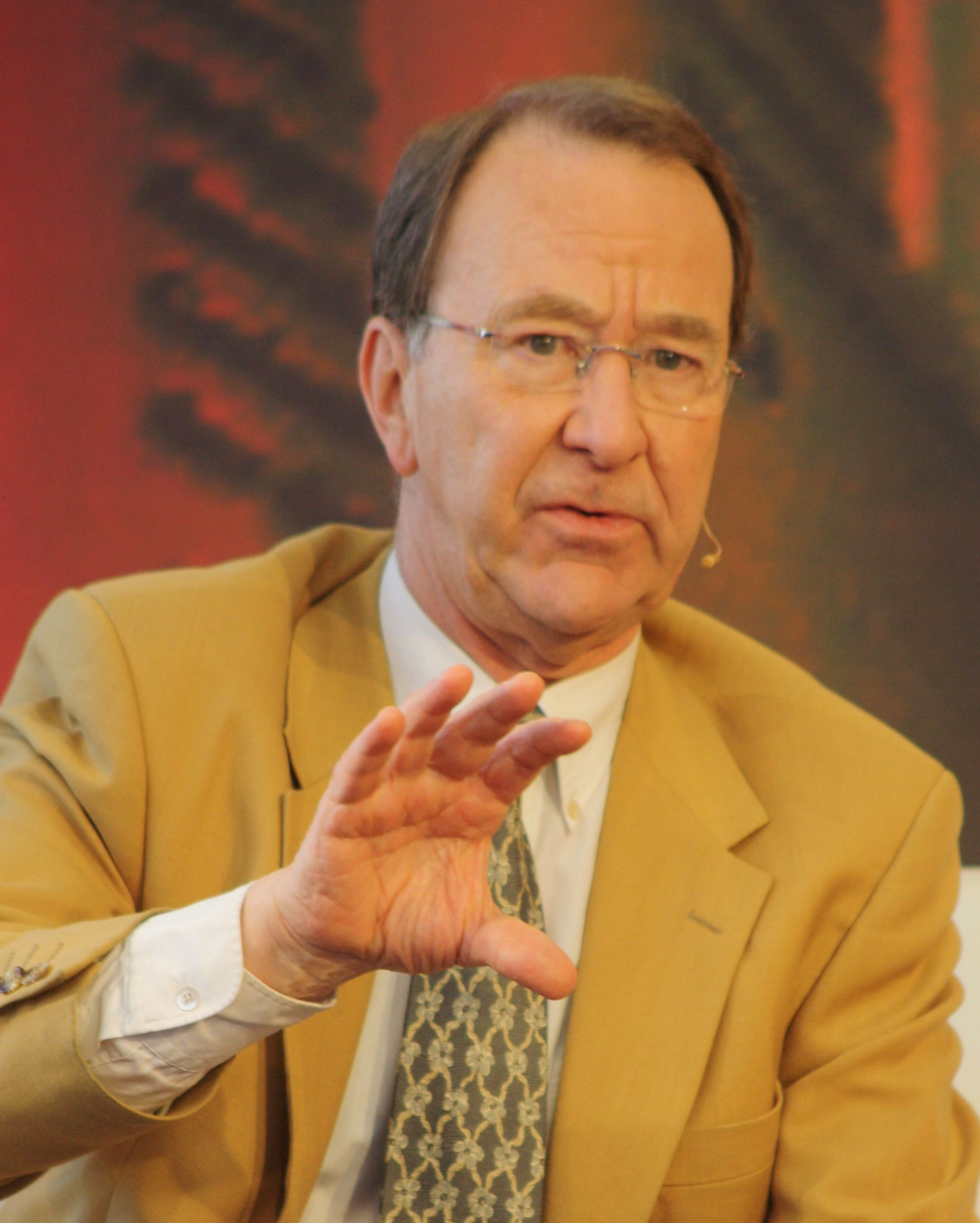
Ian Kershaw

=== Germany and Russia ===
The comparative study of Nazism and Stalinism was carried further by other scholars, such as Moshe Lewin and Ian Kershaw, and their collaborators. Writing after the dissolution of the Soviet Union, Lewin and Kershaw take a longer historical perspective and regard Nazism and Stalinism not so much as examples of a new type of society like Arendt, Friedrich, and Brzezinski did, but more as historical "anomalies" or unusual deviations from the typical path of development that most industrial societies are expected to follow.

The task of comparing Nazism and Stalinism is, according to them, a task of explaining why Germany and Russia (along with other countries) deviated from the historical norm. At the outset, Lewin and Kershaw identify similarities between the historical situations in Germany and Russia before the First World War and during that war. Both countries were ruled by authoritarian monarchies, who were under pressure to make concessions to popular demands. Both countries had "powerful bureaucracies and strong military traditions." Both had "powerful landowning classes" while also being in the process of rapid industrialisation and modernisation. Both countries had expansionist foreign policies with a particular interest in Central and Eastern Europe. Lewin and Kershaw say that these factors did not make Stalinism or Nazism inevitable but that they help explain why the Stalinist and Nazi regimes developed similar features.

=== Similarities and differences of the systems ===
Ian Kershaw stated that Stalinism and Nazism are comparable in "the nature and extent of their inhumanity" but that the two regimes were different in some aspects. Lewin and Kershaw question the usefulness of grouping the Nazi and Stalinist regimes together under a totalitarian category, saying that it remains an open question whether the similarities between them are greater or smaller than the differences. In particular, they criticise what they see as the ideologically motivated attempt to determine which regime killed more people, saying that apologists of each regime are trying to defend their side by positing that the other was responsible for more deaths.

==== Personality cult ====
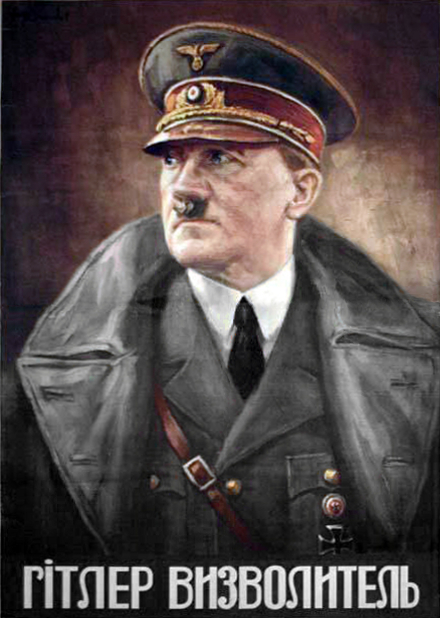
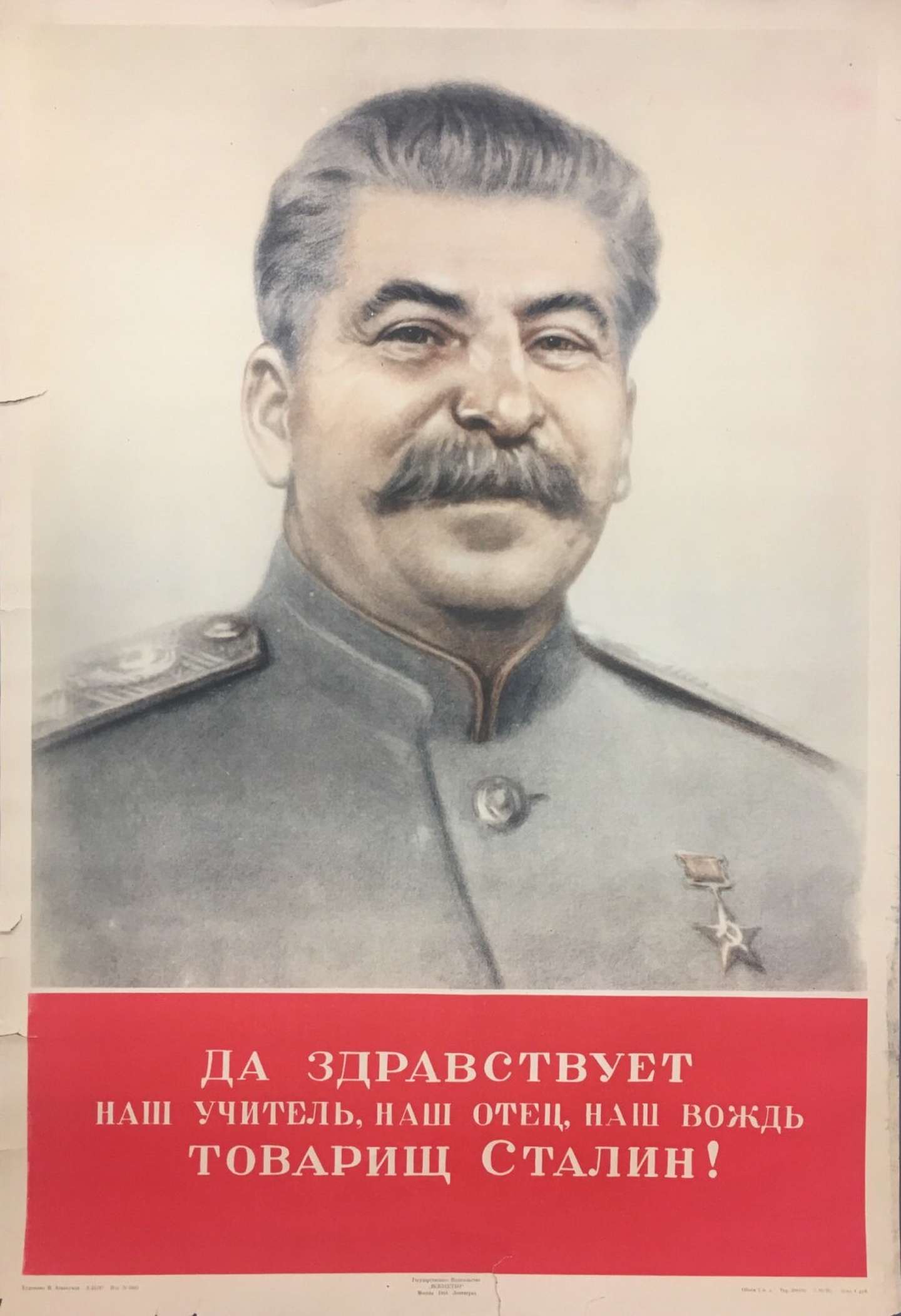
Omnipresent glorification of the supreme leader, either Führer or Vozhd, contributed to the respective cults of personality.

Lewin and Kershaw place the cult of personality at the centre of their comparison of Nazism and Stalinism, writing that both regimes "represented a new genre of political system centred upon the artificial construct of a leadership cult – the 'heroic myth' of the 'great leader', no longer a king or emperor but a 'man of the people." Concerning Stalinism, they emphasise its bureaucratic character and its "merging of the most modern with the most archaic traits" by combining modern technology and the latest methods of administration and propaganda with the ancient practice of arbitrary rule by a single man. They compare this with the Prussian military tradition in Germany, which had been called "bureaucratic absolutism" in the 18th century and played a significant role in the organisation of the Nazi state in the 20th century.

Kershaw agrees with Hans Mommsen that there was a fundamental difference between Nazism and Stalinism regarding the importance of the leader. Stalinism had an absolute leader, but he was not essential. Another could replace him. Nazism, on the other hand, was a "classic charismatic leadership movement", defined entirely by its leader. Stalinism had an ideology that existed independently of Stalin, but for Nazism, "Hitler was ideological orthodoxy", and Nazi ideals were by definition whatever Hitler said they were. In Stalinism, the bureaucratic apparatus was the foundation of the system, while in Nazism, the person of the leader was the foundation.

Lewin also focuses on the comparison between the personality cults of Hitler and Stalin, and their respective roles in Nazi Germany and the Soviet Union. He refers to them as the "Hitler myth" and the "Stalin myth", and posits that they served different functions within their two regimes. The function of the "Hitler myth" was to legitimise Nazi rule, while the function of the "Stalin myth" was to legitimise not Soviet rule itself but Stalin's leadership within the Communist Party. Stalin's personality cult existed precisely because Stalin knew that he was replaceable and feared that he might be replaced, and so needed to bolster his authority as much as possible. While the "Hitler myth" was essential to Nazi Germany, the "Stalin myth" was essential only to Stalin, not the Soviet Union itself.

==== Intrinsic instability of totalitarian systems ====
Together with Mommsen, Lewin posits that the Stalinist and Nazi regimes featured an "intrinsic structural contradiction" which led to "inherent self-destructiveness": they depended on a highly organized state bureaucracy that was trying to set up complex rules and procedures for every aspect of life, yet this bureaucracy was under the complete personal control of a despot who made policy decisions as he saw fit, routinely changing his mind on major issues, without any regard for the rules and institutions which his own bureaucracy had set up. The bureaucracy and the leader needed each other but also undermined each other with their different priorities. Mommsen sees this as a much greater problem in Nazi Germany than in Stalin's Soviet Union, as the Nazis inherited large parts of the traditional German bureaucracy. Meanwhile, the Soviets largely built their bureaucracy from the ground up. He believes that many of the irrational features of the Nazi regime, such as wasting resources on exterminating undesirable populations instead of using those resources in the war effort, were caused by the dysfunction of the Nazi state rather than a fanatical commitment to Nazi ideology.

Per the Führerprinzip, all decisional power in the Nazi state ultimately rested with Hitler, who often issued only vague and general directives, forcing other Nazi leaders lower down in the hierarchy to guess what precisely the Führer desired. This confusion produced competition between Nazi officials, as each of them attempted to prove that he was a more dedicated Nazi than his rivals by engaging in ever more extreme policies. This competition to please Hitler was, according to Mommsen, the real cause of Nazi irrationality. Hitler was aware of it and deliberately encouraged it out of a "social-Darwinist conviction that the best man would ultimately prevail." Mommsen states that this represents a structural difference between the regimes of Hitler and Stalin. Despite its purges, Stalin's regime was more effective in building a stable bureaucracy, such that the system could sustain itself and continue even without Stalin. The Nazi regime, on the other hand, was much more personalized and depended entirely on Hitler, being unable to build any lasting institutions.

==== Stalin and Hitler ====
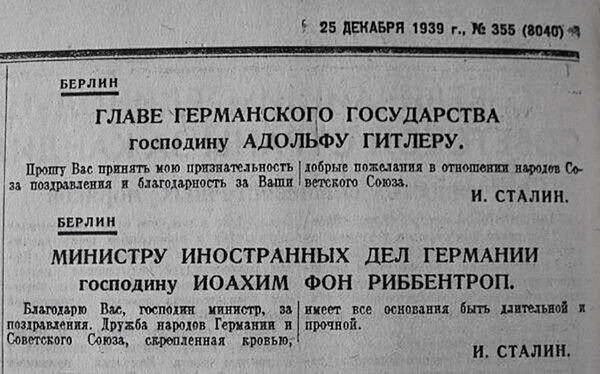
Stalin's reply to birthday greetings sent to him by Hitler, 25 December 1939

Kershaw also saw significant personal differences between Stalin and Hitler and their respective styles of rule. He describes Stalin as "a committee man, chief oligarch, man of the machine" and a "creature of his party," who came to power only thanks to his party and his ability to manipulate the levers of power within that party. Hitler, by contrast, came to power based on his charisma and mass appeal, and in the Nazi regime, it was the leader that created the party instead of the other way around. According to Kershaw, "Stalin was a highly interventionist dictator, sending a stream of letters and directives determining or interfering with policy". Meanwhile, Hitler "was a non-interventionist dictator as far as government administration was concerned," preferring to involve himself in military affairs and plans for conquest rather than the daily routine of government work, and giving only broad verbal instructions to his subordinates regarding civilian affairs, which they were expected to translate into policy.

Although both regimes featured all-pervasive cults of personality, there was a qualitative difference between those cults. Stalin's personality cult was "superimposed upon the Marxist-Leninist ideology and Communist Party". It could be abandoned or replaced with a personality cult around some other leader without major changes to the regime. On the other hand, "the 'Hitler myth' was structurally indispensable to, and the very basis of, and scarcely distinguishable from, the Nazi Movement and its Weltanschauung." The belief in the person of Hitler as the unique saviour of the German nation was the very foundation of Nazism, to such an extent that Nazism found it impossible to even imagine a successor to Hitler. In Kershaw's analysis, Stalinism was a fundamentally bureaucratic system, while Nazism embodied "charismatic authority" as described by Max Weber. Stalinism could exist without its leader, while Nazism could not.

== Philippe Burrin, Henry Rousso, and Nicolas Werth ==
The topic of comparisons between Nazism and Stalinism was also studied in the 1990s and 2000s by historians Philippe Burrin, Henry Rousso, and Nicolas Werth.

=== Differences between Nazism and Stalinism ===
Rousso defends the work of Carl Friedrich by pointing out that Friedrich himself had only said that Stalinism and Nazism were comparable, not that they were identical. Rousso also says that the popularity of the concept of totalitarianism, the way that large numbers of people have come to routinely refer to certain governments as totalitarian, should be seen as evidence that the concept is useful, that it describes a specific type of government which is different from other dictatorships. At the same time, Rousso states that the concept of totalitarianism is descriptive rather than analytical: the regimes described as totalitarian do not have a common origin and did not arise in similar ways. Nazism is unique among totalitarian regimes in having taken power in "a country endowed with an advanced industrial economy and with a system of political democracy (and an even older political pluralism)."

According to Rousso, all other examples of totalitarianism, including the Stalinist regime, took power "in an agrarian economy, in a poor society without a tradition of political pluralism, not to mention democracy, and where diverse forms of tyranny had traditionally prevailed." He sees this as a weakness of the concept of totalitarianism, because it merely describes the similarities between Stalinism and Nazism without dealing with the very different ways they came to power. On the other hand, Rousso agrees with Arendt that "totalitarian regimes constitute something new in regard to classical tyranny, authoritarian regimes, or other forms of ancient and medieval dictatorships", and he says that the main strength of the concept of totalitarianism is the way it highlights this inherent novelty of the regimes involved.

=== Conflict between dictator and bureaucracy ===
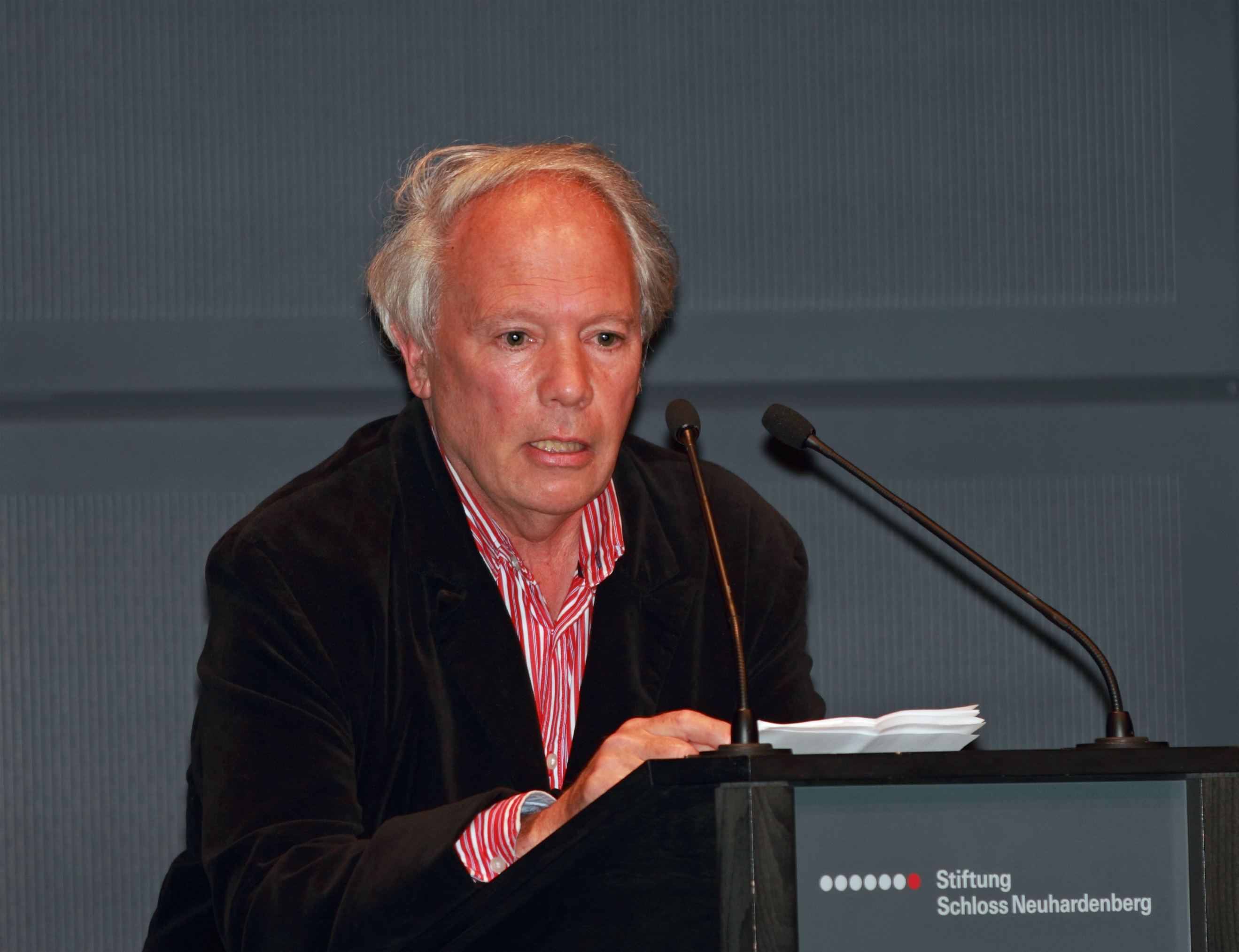
Nicolas Werth

Nicolas Werth and Philippe Burrin have worked on comparative assessments of Stalinism and Nazism, with Werth covering the Stalinist regime and Burrin covering Nazi Germany. One of the topics they have studied is how much power the dictator held in the two regimes. Werth identifies two main historiographical approaches in the study of the Stalinist regime: Those who emphasise the power and control exercised by Stalin himself, attributing most of the actions of the Soviet government to deliberate plans and decisions made by him, and those who posit that Stalin had no pre-determined course of action in mind, that he was reacting to events as they unfolded, and that the Soviet bureaucracy had its own agenda which often differed from Stalin's wishes. Werth regards these as two mistaken extremes, one making Stalin seem all-powerful, the other making him seem like a weak dictator. He believes that the competing perspectives help draw attention to the tension between two different forms of organisation in the Stalinist Soviet Union, namely an "administrative system of command", bureaucratic and resistant to change but effective in running the Soviet state, and the strategy of "running the country in a crudely despotic way by Stalin and his small cadre of directors." Werth agrees with Lewin that there was an inherent conflict between the priorities of the Soviet bureaucracy and Stalin's accumulation of absolute power in his own hands. According to Werth, this unresolved and unstated conflict led to the Great Purge and the use of terror by Stalin's regime against its party and state cadres.

In studying similar issues concerning the Nazi regime, Burrin draws attention to the debate between the "Intentionalist" and "Functionalist" schools of thought, which dealt with the question of whether the Nazi regime represented an extension of Hitler's autocratic will, faithfully obeying his wishes, or whether it was an essentially chaotic and uncontrollable system that functioned on its own with little direct input from the Führer. Like Kershaw and Lewin, Burrin says that the relationship between the leader and his party's ideology was different in Nazism compared to Stalinism in that "[o]ne can rightly state that Nazism cannot be dissociated from Hitlerism, something that is difficult to affirm for Bolshevism and Stalinism." Unlike Stalin, who inherited an existing system with an existing ideology and presented himself as the rightful heir to the Leninist political tradition, Hitler created both his movement and its ideology by himself, and claimed to be "someone sent by Providence, a Messiah whom the German people had been expecting for centuries, even for two thousand years, as Heinrich Himmler enjoyed saying." There could be no conflict between the party and the leader in Nazi Germany because the Nazi Party's entire reason for existence was to support and follow Hitler; there was a potential for division between the leader and the state bureaucracy due to the way that Nazism came to power as part of an alliance with traditional conservative elites, industrialists, and the army.

Unlike the Soviet Union, Nazi Germany did not build its own state but inherited the state machinery of the previous government. This provided the Nazis with an immediate supply of capable and experienced managers and military commanders; however, it also meant that the Nazi regime had to rely on the cooperation of people who had not been Nazis before Hitler's rise to power and whose loyalty was questionable. It was only during the war, when Nazi Germany conquered large territories and had to create Nazi administrations for them, that brand new Nazi bureaucracies were created without any input or participation from traditional German elites. This produced a surprising difference between Nazism and Stalinism; when the Stalinist Soviet Union conquered territory, it created smaller copies of itself and installed them as the governments of the occupied countries, while Nazi Germany did not attempt to create copies of the German government back home, and experimented with different power structures and policies, often reflecting a "far more ample Nazification of society than what the balance of power authorised in the Reich."

=== Role of terror and violence ===
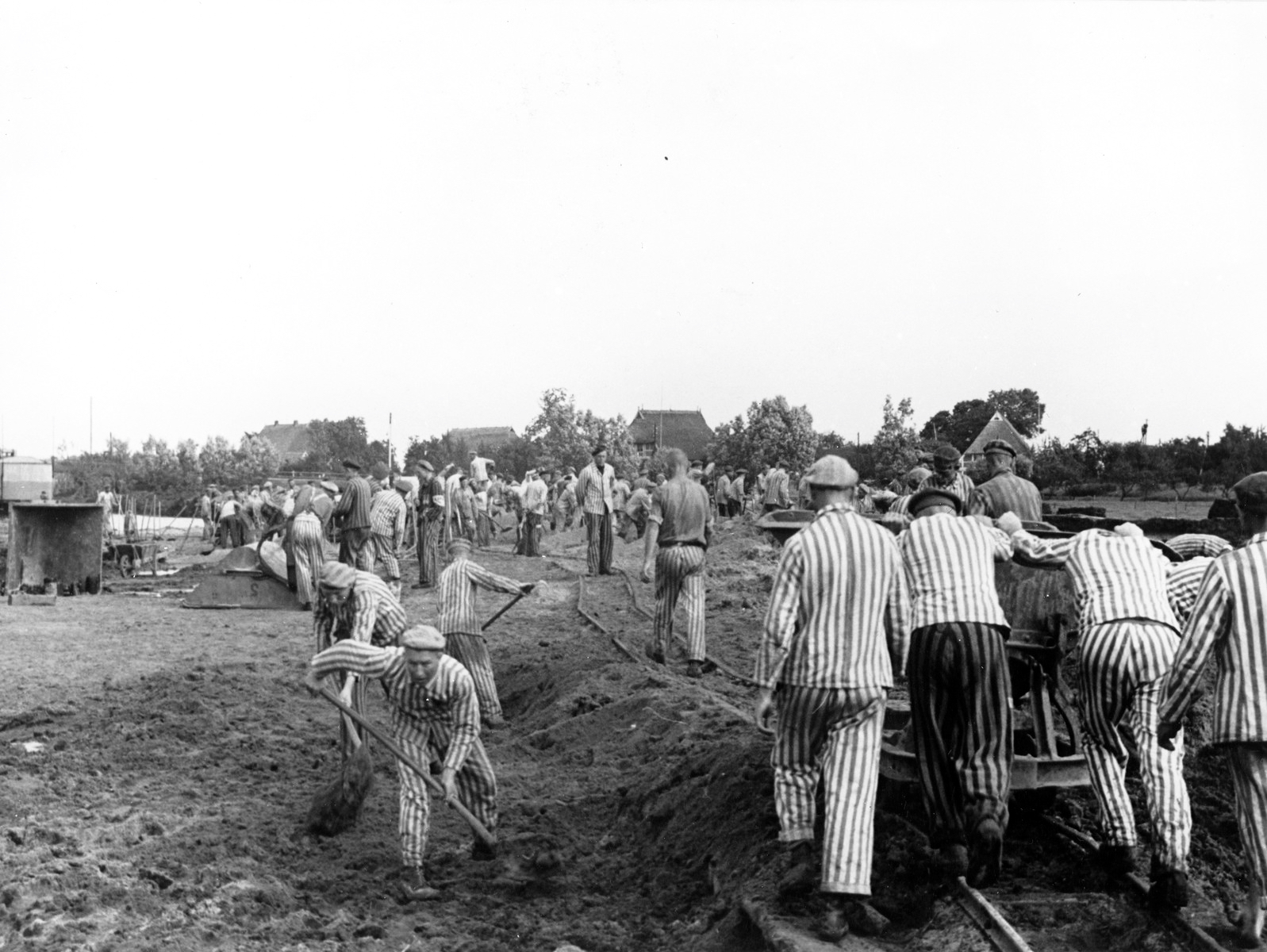
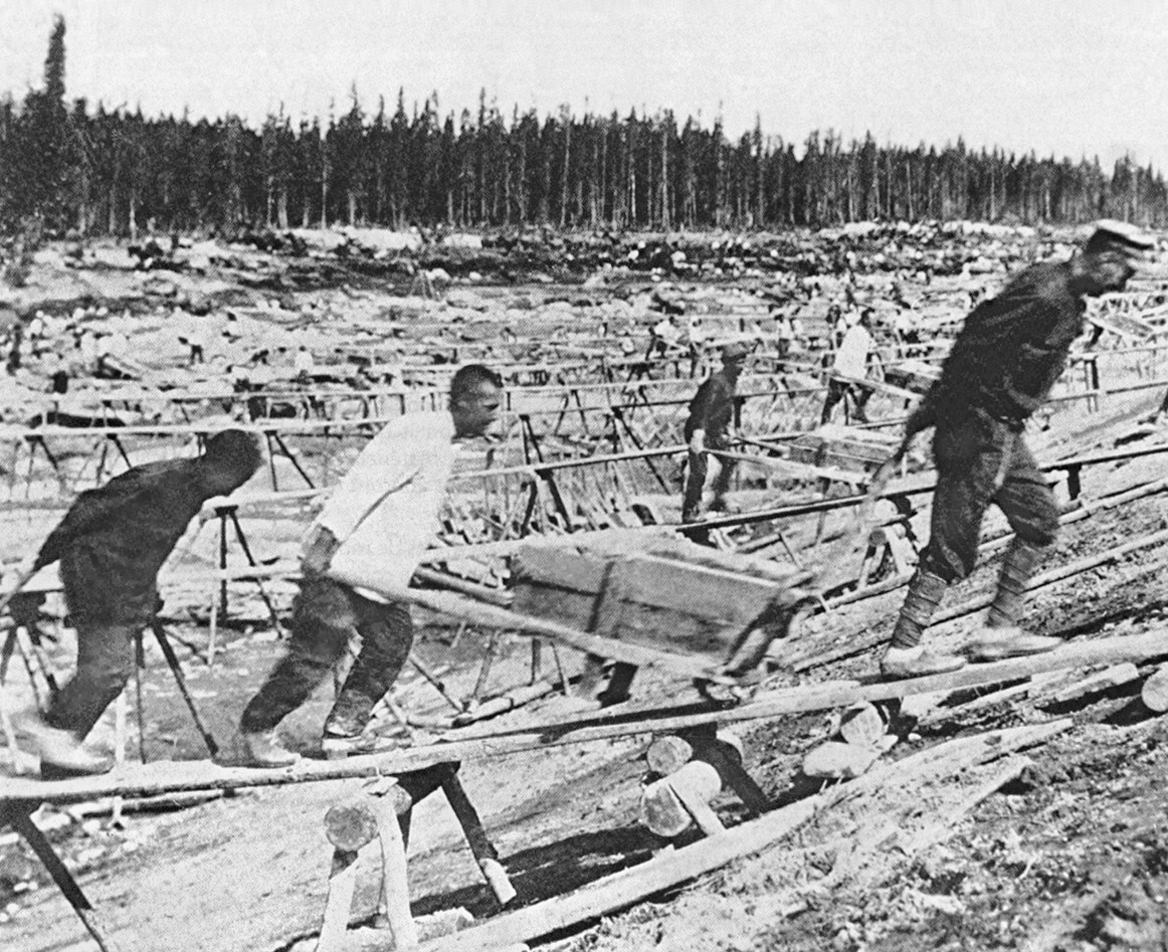
Shown left are Neuengamme slave labourers digging the Dove–Elbe canal. Right are Belbaltlag "canal armymen" digging the White Sea–Baltic canal.

Another major topic investigated by Werth and Burrin was the violence and terror employed by the régimes of Hitler and Stalin. Werth reports that the Stalinist Soviet Union underwent an "extraordinary brutalisation of the relations between state and society" for rapid modernisation and industrialisation, to "gain one hundred years in one decade, and to metamorphose the country into a great industrial power". This transformation was accomplished at the cost of massive violence and a sociopolitical regression into what Werth calls "military-feudal exploitation". The methods employed by the Stalinist regime included loss of civil rights, mass arrests, deportations of entire ethnic groups from one part of the Soviet Union to another, forced labour in the Gulag, mass executions (especially during the Great Terror of 1937–1938), and the great famine of 1932–1933, known as the Holodomor. All levels of Soviet society, from top to bottom, were affected by Stalinist repression. At the top, high-ranking members of the Soviet Communist party were arrested and executed under the suspicion that they had plotted against Stalin. In some cases, they were forced to confess to imaginary crimes – for example in the Moscow trials of 1936–1938. At the bottom, the peasantry suffered in the Soviet famine of 1930–1933 and faced very high grain-quotas even outside the famine years.

Werth identifies four categories of people that became targets of Stalinist violence in the Soviet Union from 1930 until around 1952. He lists them from smallest to largest:

- The first and smallest group consisted of many of Stalin's former comrades-in-arms, who had participated in the revolution and were known as "Old Bolsheviks". Stalin deemed them dangerous to himself because they had known him before his rise to power and could – even accidentally – expose some of the many false claims fostered in his personality cult.
- The second group covered mid-level Communist Party officials, subject to mass arrests and executions in the late 1930s, particularly during the Great Purge. Eliminating them served a dual purpose: it helped Stalin to centralise power to the Kremlin from regional centres, and provided him with "corrupt officials" that he could blame for earlier repressions and unpopular policies. Werth draws parallels between this and the old Tsarist tradition of blaming "bad bureaucrats" for unpopular government actions – rather than the Tsar.
- The third group comprised ordinary citizens from all walks of life who resorted to petty crime to provide for themselves in the face of worsening living-standards, for example, by taking home some wheat from the fields or tools from the factory. This type of petty crime became very widespread and was often punished as "sabotage" – allegedly motivated by political opposition to the Soviet Union.
- The fourth and largest category consisted of ethnic groups subject to deportation, famine, or arbitrary arrests under the suspicion of being collectively disloyal to Stalin or to the Soviet state. This included the Holodomor, the deportation of ethnic groups suspected of pro-German sympathies (such as the Volga Germans, the Crimean Tatars, the Chechens, and others), and eventually also persecution of ethnic Jews, as Stalin grew increasingly antisemitic near the end of his life.

Burrin's study of violence carried out by the Nazi régime begins with the observation that "violence is at the heart of Nazism" and that Nazi violence is "established as a doctrine and exalted in speech". According to Burrin, this marks a point of difference between Nazism and Stalinism. In Stalinism, there was a gulf between ideology and reality when it came to violence. The Soviet régime continuously denied being repressive, proclaimed itself a defender of peace, and sought to conceal all evidence to the contrary. In Nazism, on the other hand, "doctrine and reality were fused from the start". Nazism not only practised violent repression and war, but advocated these actions in principle as well, considering war as a positive force in human civilization, and openly seeking Lebensraum ("living space") and the domination of the European continent by ethnic Germans.

Burrin identifies three motivations for Nazi violence: political repression, exclusion and social repression, and racial politics:

- The first motivation, political repression, occurs commonly under many dictatorships. The Nazis aimed to eliminate their real or imagined political opponents, first in the Reich and later in the occupied territories during World War II. Some of these opponents were executed, while others were imprisoned in concentration camps. The first targets of political repression, immediately after Hitler's rise to power in 1933, were the parties of the left in general and the Communist Party of Germany in particular. After the mid-1930s, repression extended to clergy members and later to the conservative opposition, especially after the failed attempt to assassinate Hitler in July 1944. The death penalty was used on a wide scale, even by 1930s standards. During the war, political repression expanded greatly inside Germany and especially in the newly occupied territories. Political prisoners in the concentration camps numbered only about 25,000 at the beginning of the war. By January 1945, they had swelled to 714,211, most of them non-Germans accused of plotting against the Reich.
- The second type of Nazi violence, motivated by exclusion and social repression, was the violence aimed at purging German society of people whose behavior was considered incompatible with the social norms of the Nazi régime, even if the people involved were racially pure and able-bodied. Such people were divided into two categories: homosexuals and "asocials", who were only vaguely defined, but included "Gypsies, tramps, beggars, prostitutes, alcoholics, the jobless who refused any employment, and those who left their work frequently or for no reason".
- The third and final type of Nazi violence, by far the most extensive, was violence motivated by Nazi racial policies. This was aimed both inward, to cleanse the "Aryan race" of "degenerate" elements and life unworthy of life, and outward to seek the extermination of Untermenschen ("subhumans"). Germans considered physically or mentally unfit were among the first victims. One of the first laws of the Nazi régime mandated the forced sterilisation of people suffering from physical handicaps or who had psychiatric conditions deemed to be hereditary. Later, sterilisation was replaced by the murder of the mentally ill and of people with severe disabilities as part of a "euthanasia" program called Aktion T4. Burrin states that this served no practical political purpose, as the people being murdered could not have possibly been political opponents of the régime. Hence, the motivation was purely a matter of racial ideology. The most systematic and by far the most large-scale acts of Nazi violence were directed at "racially inferior" non-ethnic-German populations. As laid out in Generalplan Ost, the Nazis wished to eliminate most of the Slavic populations of Eastern Europe, partly through deportation and partly through murder, to secure land for ethnic German settlement and colonisation. Even more urgently, the Nazis wished to exterminate the Jews of Europe, whom they regarded as the implacable racial enemy of Germans. This culminated in the Holocaust, the Nazi genocide of the Jews. Unlike all other target populations, the Jews were to be exterminated completely, with – in theory – no individual exceptions for any reason.

== Michael Geyer and Sheila Fitzpatrick ==
In Beyond Totalitarianism: Stalinism and Nazism Compared, editors Michael Geyer and Sheila Fitzpatrick dispute the concept of totalitarianism, noting that the term entered political discourse first as a term of self-description by the Italian fascists and was only later used as a framework to compare Nazi Germany with the Soviet Union. They posit that the totalitarian states were not as monolithic or as ideology-driven as they seemed. Geyer and Fitzpatrick describe Nazi Germany and the Stalinist Soviet Union as "immensely powerful, threatening, and contagious dictatorships" who "shook the world in their antagonism." Without calling them totalitarian, they identify their common features, including genocide, an all-powerful party, a charismatic leader, and pervasive invasion of privacy. They posit that Stalinism and Nazism did not represent a new and unique type of government, and can be placed in the broader context of the turn to dictatorship in Europe in the interwar period. They appear extraordinary because they were the "most prominent, most hard-headed, and most violent" of the European dictatorships of the 20th century. They are comparable because of their "shock and awe" and sheer ruthlessness but underneath superficial similarities were fundamentally different, and that "when it comes to one-on-one comparison, the two societies and regimes may as well have hailed from different worlds."

According to Geyer and Fitzpatrick, the similarities between Nazism and Stalinism stem from being "ideology driven" and sought to subordinate all aspects of life to their respective ideologies. The differences stem from the fact that their ideologies were opposed to each other and regarded each other as enemies. Another major difference is that Stalin created a stable and long-lasting regime, while Nazi Germany had a "short-lived, explosive nature." The stable state created by Stalinism was based on an entirely new elite, while Nazism, despite having the support of the traditional elite, failed to achieve stability. According to Geyer and Fitzpatrick, the two regimes borrowed ideas from one another, especially regarding propaganda techniques, most of all in architecture and cinema, but also in terms of state surveillance and antisemitism. At the same time, they both vigorously denied borrowing anything from each other. While their propaganda methods were similar, the content was different; Soviet wartime propaganda revolved around the idea of resisting imperial aggression, while Nazi propaganda was about wars of racial conquest. Geyer and Fitzpatrick state that while both Stalinism and Nazism sought to create a New Man, an "entirely modern, illiberal, and self-fashioned personage", they had different visions about what being a New Man would mean.

=== Biopolitics, eugenics, and social engineering ===
Among the other authors contributing to the volume edited by Geyer and Fitzpatrick, David L. Hoffmann and Annette Timm discuss biopolitics and the pro-natalist policies of the Nazi and Stalinist regimes. Both governments were to some extent, sincerely concerned over low fertility rates in their respective populations and applied extensive and intrusive social engineering techniques to increase births. Reproductive policies in the Soviet Union and Nazi Germany were administered through their health care systems. Both regimes saw health care as a key pillar to their designs to develop a new society. While the Soviet Union had to design a public health care system from scratch, Nazi Germany built upon Germany's pre-existing public health care system that existed since 1883, when Otto von Bismarck's legislation had created the world's first national public health care program. The Nazis centralised the German health care system in order to enforce Nazi ideological components upon it. They replaced existing voluntary and government welfare agencies with new ones devoted to racial hygiene and other components of Nazi ideology.

The Nazi and Stalinist attempt to control family size was not unique. Many other European states practised eugenics at this time (including most of the Allies), and the Stalinist and Nazi ideals were vastly different. They had more in common with third parties than with each other, as Nazi Germany's policies were somewhat similar to those in Scandinavia at the time. In contrast, the Soviet Union's policies resembled those in Catholic countries. The common point between Nazi and Stalinist practices was the connection of reproduction policies with the ideological goals of the state, described as "part of the project of a rational, hypermodern vision for the re-organisation of society". There were nevertheless substantial differences between the two regimes' approaches. Stalin's Soviet Union never officially supported eugenics as the Nazis did, and the Soviet government called eugenics a "fascist science", although there were Soviet eugenicists. The two regimes also had different approaches to the relationship between family and paid labour, as Nazism promoted the male single-breadwinner family while Stalinism promoted the dual-wage-earner household.

=== Mass violence, xenophobia, and persecution of ethnic minorities ===
In another contribution to the same volume, Christian Gerlach and Nicolas Werth discuss the topic of mass violence and the way that both Stalinism and Nazism used it. Both Stalin's Soviet Union and Nazi Germany were violent societies where the state accepted mass violence, such as the Great Terror of 1937 to 1938 in the Soviet Union and the Holocaust in Nazi Germany and its occupied territories in World War II.

The Stalinist Soviet Union and Nazi Germany utilised internment camps led by state agencies: the NKVD in the Soviet Union and the SS in Nazi Germany. They also engaged in violence against minorities based on xenophobia, with the xenophobic violence of the Nazis being outspoken but rationalised as being against "asocial" elements. In contrast, the xenophobic violence of the Stalinists was disguised as being against "anti-Soviet", "counter-revolutionary", and "socially harmful" elements, a term which often targeted diaspora nationalities. The Stalinist Soviet Union established "special settlements" where the "socially harmful" or "socially dangerous" who included ex-convicts, criminals, vagrants, the disenfranchised, and "declassed elements" were expelled to. These "special settlements" were mainly in Siberia, the far north, the Urals, or other inhospitable territories. In July 1933, the Soviet Union made a mass arrest of 5,000 Romani people effectively based on their ethnicity, who were deported that month to the "special settlements" in Western Siberia. In 1935, the Soviet Union arrested 160,000 homeless people and juvenile delinquents and sent many of them to NKVD labour colonies where they did forced labour.

The Nazi regime was founded upon a racialist view of politics and envisioned the deportation or extermination of the majority of the population of Eastern Europe in order to open up "living space" for ethnic German settlers. This was mainly intended to be carried out after an eventual German victory, but steps had already started being taken while the war was still ongoing. For instance, by the end of 1942, the Nazis had deported 365,000 Poles and Jews from their original homes in western Poland (now German-annexed) and into the General Government. A further 194,000 Poles were internally displaced (not deported to another territory but expelled from their homes). The Nazis had also deported 100,000 persons from Alsace, Lorraine, and Luxembourg, as well as 54,000 Slovenians.

Stalinism in practice in the Soviet Union pursued ethnic deportations from the 1930s to the early 1950s, with a total of 3 million Soviet citizens being subjected to ethnic-based resettlement. The first major ethnic deportation took place from December 1932 to January 1933. Some 60,000 Kuban Cossacks were collectively criminally charged as a whole with association with resistance to socialism and affiliation with Ukrainian nationalism. From 1935 to 1936, the Soviet Union deported Soviet citizens of Polish and German origins living in the western districts of Ukraine, and Soviet citizens of Finnish origins living on the Finland-Soviet Union border. These deportations from 1935 to 1936 affected tens of thousands of families. From September to October 1937, Soviet authorities deported the Korean minority from its Far Eastern region that bordered on Japanese-controlled Korea. Soviet authorities claimed that the territory was "rich soil for the Japanese to till", implying a Soviet suspicion that the Koreans could join forces with the Japanese to unite the land with Japanese-held Korea. Over 170,000 Koreans were deported to remote parts of Soviet Central Asia from September to October 1937. These ethnically based deportations reflected a new trend in Stalinist policy, a "Soviet xenophobia" based on ideological grounds that suspected that these people were susceptible to foreign influence, and which was also based on a resurgent Russian nationalism.

After Nazi Germany declared war on the Soviet Union in 1941, the Soviet Union initiated another major round of ethnic deportations. The first group targeted were Soviet Germans. Between September 1941 and February 1942, 900,000 people, over 70 per cent of the entire Soviet German community, were deported to Kazakhstan and Siberia in mass operations. A second wave of mass deportations took place between November 1943 and May 1944, in which Soviet authorities expelled six ethnic groups, such as the Balkars, Chechens, Crimean Tatars, Ingush, Karachai, and Kalmyks, that together numbered 900,000. There were also smaller-scale operations involving ethnic cleansing of diaspora minorities during and after World War II, in which tens of thousands of Crimean Bulgarians, Greeks, Iranians, Khemshils, Kurds, and Meskhetian Turks were deported from the Black Sea and Transcaucasian border regions.

Two ethnic groups specifically targeted for persecution by Stalin's Soviet Union were the Chechens and the Ingush. Unlike the other nationalities suspected of connection to foreign states that shared their ethnic background, the Chechens and the Ingush were completely indigenous people of the Soviet Union. Rather than being accused of collaboration with foreign enemies, these two ethnic groups were considered to have cultures that did not fit in with Soviet culture, such as accusing Chechens of being associated with "banditism", and the authorities claimed that the Soviet Union had to intervene in order to "remake" and "reform" these cultures. In practice, this meant heavily armed punitive operations against Chechen "bandits" that failed to achieve forced assimilation, culminating in an ethnic cleansing operation in 1944, which involved the arrests and deportation of over 500,000 Chechens and Ingush from the Caucasus to Central Asia and Kazakhstan. The deportations of the Chechens and Ingush also involved the outright massacre of thousands of people and severe conditions placed upon the deportees; they were put in unsealed train cars, with little to no food for a four-week journey during which many died from hunger and exhaustion. The main difference between Nazi and Stalinist deportations was in their purpose. While Nazi Germany sought ethnic cleansing to allow settlement by Germans into the cleansed territory, Stalin's Soviet Union pursued ethnic cleansing to remove minorities from strategically important areas.

== Other scholars ==
In 1952, British historian Alan Bullock wrote the first comprehensive biography of Hitler, which dominated Hitler scholarship for many years. His Hitler: A Study in Tyranny showed him as an opportunistic Machtpolitiker ("power politician") devoid of principles, beliefs, or scruples, whose actions throughout his career were motivated only by a lust for power. Bullock's views led in the 1950s to a debate with Hugh Trevor-Roper, who posited that Hitler possessed beliefs, albeit repulsive ones, and that his actions were motivated by them. In 1991, Bullock published Hitler and Stalin: Parallel Lives, in which he showed how the careers of Hitler and Stalin, whose "personal malice marked him out from Hitler, who was astonishingly tolerant of inadequate colleagues", fed off each other to some extent. The book was a success, despite Bullock's friends fearing it would flop and others who doubted the two lives were parallel in any meaningful sense, and Bullock came to the thesis that Stalin's ability to consolidate power in his home country and not to over-extend himself enabled him to retain power longer than Hitler, whom Bullock favoured to spend a weekend with, as part of a frivolous question, because "although it would have been boring in the extreme, you would have had a greater certainty in coming back alive." American historian Ronald Spector praised Bullock's ability to write about the development of Nazism and Stalinism without either abstract generalisation or irrelevant detail. Israeli academic Amikam Nachmani wrote that Bullock's Hitler and Stalin "come out as two blood-thirsty, pathologically evil, sanguine tyrants, who are sure of the presence of determinism, hence having unshakeable beliefs that Destiny assigned on them historical missions—the one to pursue a social industrialised revolution in the Soviet Union, the other to turn Germany into a global empire."

According to Stalin's interpreter, Valentin Berezhkov, Stalin spoke highly of the Night of the Long Knives in 1934 and viewed Hitler as a "great man" who had demonstrated "the way to deal with your political opponents." Berezhkov also suggested parallels between Hitler's inner party purge and Stalin's mass repressions of the Old Bolsheviks, military commanders, and intellectuals.

In his work on fascism, American historian Stanley G. Payne said that although the Nazi Party was ideologically opposed to communism, Hitler and other Nazi leaders frequently expressed recognition that only in the Soviet Union were their revolutionary and ideological counterparts to be found. Both placed a major emphasis on creating a "party-army", with the regular armed forces controlled by the party. In the case of the Soviet Union, this was done through the political commissars, while Nazi Germany introduced a roughly equivalent leadership role for "National Socialist Guidance Officers" in 1943. In his work on Stalinism, French historian François Furet commented that despite ideological differences, Hitler personally admired Stalin and publicly praised him on numerous occasions for seeking to purify the Soviet Communist Party of Jewish influences, especially by purging Jewish communists, such as Leon Trotsky, Grigory Zinoviev, Lev Kamenev, and Karl Radek. American academic Richard Pipes drew attention to Stalin and antisemitism in a parallel with Nazi antisemitism. He states that soon after the 1917 October Revolution, the Soviet Union undertook practices to break up Jewish culture, religion, and language. In the fall of 1918, the Soviet Communist Party set up the Jewish section Yevsektsiya, with a stated mission of "destruction of traditional Jewish life, the Zionist movement, and Hebrew culture." By 1919, the Bolsheviks confiscated Jewish properties, Hebrew schools, libraries, books, and synagogues under newly imposed anti-religious laws, turning their buildings into "Communist centers, clubs or restaurants." After Stalin rose to power, antisemitism continued to be endemic throughout Russia, although official Soviet policy condemned it.

Marxist political scientist Michael Parenti stated that many of the narratives which equate Nazism, or fascism more generally, and Stalinism, or communism more generally, are often simplistic and usually omit the class interests of each respective movement. Parenti says that the fascists in Germany and Italy, despite "some meager social programs" and public works projects designed to bolster nationalist sentiment, supported and served the interests of big business and the capitalist class at the expense of the workers by outlawing strikes and unions, privatising state-owned mills, plants, and banks along with farm cooperatives, abolishing workplace safety regulations, minimum wage laws and overtime pay, and subsidising heavy industry. This resulted in the fascists having many admirers and supporters among the capitalist class in their nations and the West, including the United States. By contrast, while stating there were deficiencies in Marxist–Leninist states, some of which he attributes to maldevelopment due to outside pressure from a hostile capitalist world, and acknowledging the numerous state-sanctioned imprisonments and killings, which he says were exaggerated for political reasons, Parenti asserts that the Stalinist regime in particular "made dramatic gains in literacy, industrial wages, health care and women's rights", and communist revolutions in general "created a life for the mass of people that was far better than the wretched existence they had endured under feudal lords, military bosses, foreign colonizers and Western capitalists."

Jacques Sémelin writes that Stéphane Courtois and Jean-Louis Margolin "view class genocide as the equivalent to racial genocide." Alongside Michael Mann, they contributed to "the debates on comparisons between Nazism and communism", with Sémelin describing this as a theory also developed in The Black Book of Communism. According to historian Andrzej Paczkowski, only Courtois made the comparison between communism and Nazism. Meanwhile, the other sections of the book "are, in effect, narrowly focused monographs, which do not pretend to offer overarching explanations." Paczkowski wonders whether it can be applied "the same standard of judgment to, on the one hand, an ideology that was destructive at its core, that openly planned genocide, and that had an agenda of aggression against all neighbouring (and not just neighbouring) states, and, on the other hand, an ideology that seemed clearly the opposite, that was based on the secular desire of humanity to achieve equality and social justice, and that promised a great leap of forward into freedom", and stated that while a good question, it is inappropriate and hardly new because The Black Book of Communism is not "about communism as an ideology or even about communism as a state-building phenomenon."

In comparing the deaths caused by both Stalin and Hitler's policies, historians have asserted that archival evidence released after the dissolution of the Soviet Union confirms that Stalin did not kill more people than Hitler. In 2011, American historian Timothy Snyder said the Nazi regime killed about 11 million non-combatants (which rises to above 12 million if "foreseeable deaths from deportation, hunger, and sentences in concentration camps are included"), with comparable figures for Stalin's regime being roughly 6 and 9 million. Australian historian and archival researcher Stephen G. Wheatcroft posited that "[t]he Stalinist regime was consequently responsible for about a million purposive killings, and through its criminal neglect and irresponsibility it was probably responsible for the premature deaths of about another two million more victims amongst the repressed population, i.e. in the camps, colonies, prisons, exile, in transit and in the POW camps for Germans. These are clearly much lower figures than those for whom Hitler's regime was responsible." According to Wheatcroft, unlike Hitler, Stalin's "purposive killings" fit more closely into the category of "execution" than "murder", given he thought the accused were indeed guilty of crimes against the state and insisted on documentation. In contrast, Hitler wanted to kill Jews and communists because of who they were, insisted on no documentation, and was indifferent at even a pretence of legality for these actions.

According to historian Thomas Kühne, going back to the Historikerstreit, conservative intellectuals such as Ernst Nolte and the Holocaust uniqueness debate, the attempts to link Soviet and Nazi crimes, citing books such as Snyder's Bloodlands as prominent examples, are

"as politically tricky today as it was then. As it seems to reduce the responsibility of the Nazis and their collaborators, supporters and claqueurs, it is welcomed in rightist circles of various types: German conservatives in the 1980s, who wanted to 'normalise' the German past, and East European and ultranationalists today, who downplay Nazi crimes and up-play Communist crimes in order to promote a common European memory that merges Nazism and Stalinism into a 'double-genocide' theory that prioritises East European suffering over Jewish suffering, obfuscates the distinction between perpetrators and victims, and provides relief from the bitter legacy of East Europeans' collaboration in the Nazi genocide."

Kristen Ghodsee, an ethnographer of post-Cold War Eastern Europe, contends that the efforts to institutionalise the "double genocide thesis", or the moral equivalence between the Nazi Holocaust (race murder) and the victims of communism (class murder), and in particular, the push during the 2008 financial crisis for the commemoration of the latter in Europe, can be seen as the response by economic and political elites to fears of a leftist resurgence in the face of devastated economies and extreme inequalities in both the East and West as the result of neoliberal capitalism. She states that any discussion of the achievements under communism, including literacy, education, women's rights, and social security, is usually silenced. Any discourse on the subject of communism is focused almost exclusively on Stalin's crimes and the "double genocide thesis", an intellectual paradigm summed up as such: "1) any move towards redistribution and away from a completely free market is seen as communist; 2) anything communist inevitably leads to class murder; and 3) class murder is the moral equivalent of the Holocaust." By linking all leftist and socialist ideals to the excesses of Stalinism, Ghodsee says that the elites in the West hope to discredit and marginalise all political ideologies that could "threaten the primacy of private property and free markets."

Historian Nicholas Doumanis states that the totalitarian perspective of equating Nazi Germany and the Soviet Union under Stalin is not conceivable and is a misunderstanding of the two distinct natures of the regimes, which is why they were enemies. Stalin's main goal was to create a socialist state, under the banner of socialism in one country, that was autarkic, industrialised, and multiethnic. Genocide was not in Stalin's plans, rather nationalism and nation-building were, and it was not inherent in the building of a non-capitalist, non-expansionary state. Political scientist Laure Neumayer states that The Black Book of Communism contributed greatly to legitimising "the equivalence of Nazi and Communist crimes" by "making criminality the very essence of communism." Neumayer writes that the book "figures prominently in the 'spaces of the anti-communist cause' comparably structured in the former satellite countries", which are "a major source of the discourse" criminalising the communist period.

Some research institutions are focusing on the analysis of fascism/Nazism and Stalinism/communist states, and the comparative approach, including the Hannah Arendt Institute for Totalitarianism Studies in Germany, the Institute for the Study of Totalitarian Regimes in Czechia, and the Institute of National Remembrance in Poland. Nonetheless, the comparison of Nazism and Stalinism remains a neglected field of academic study.

== In political discourse ==
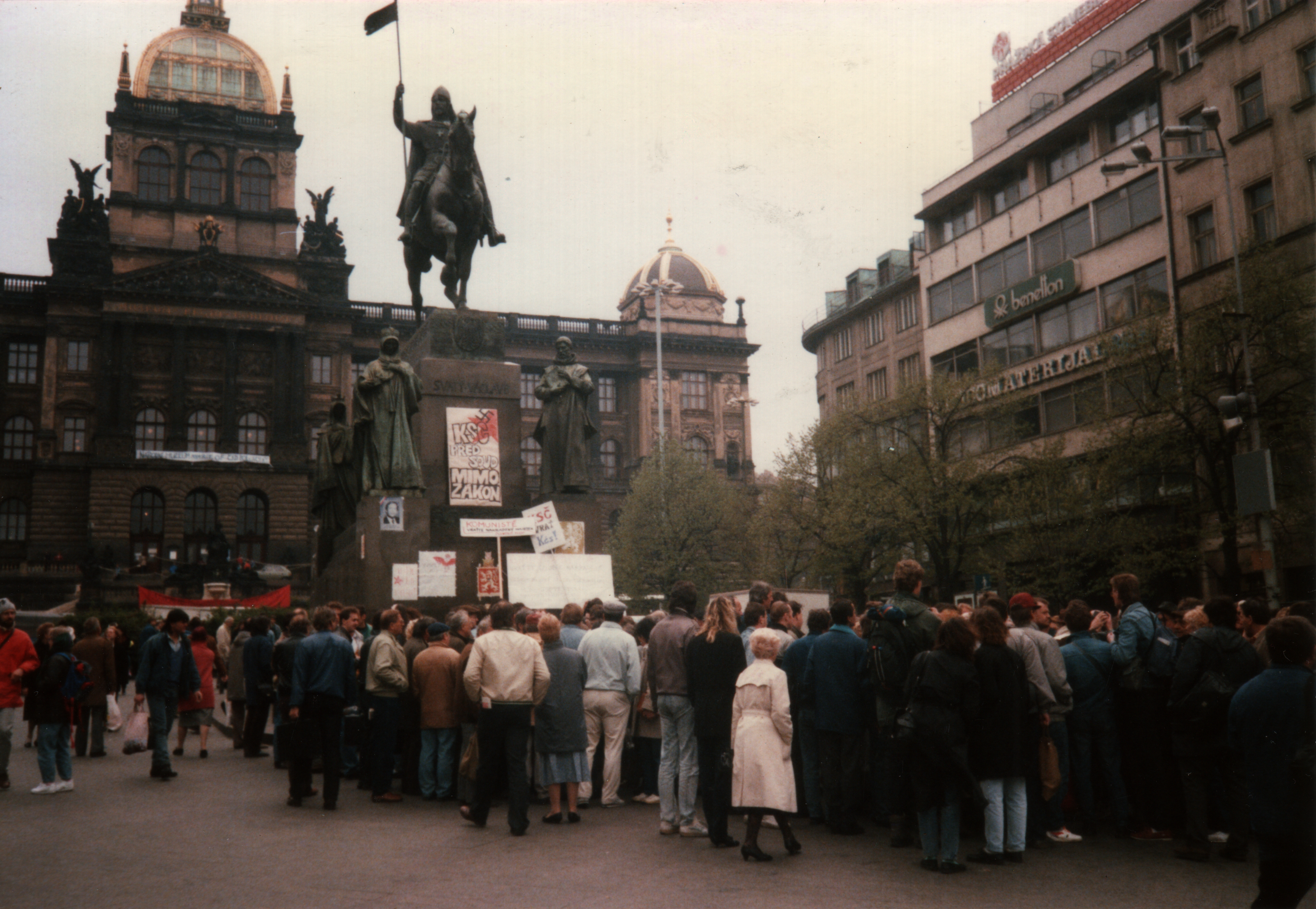
At a demonstration in Prague in April 1990, a swastika is drawn on an anti-KSČ (Communist Party of Czechoslovakia) election banner

In the 1920s, the social fascism theory advanced by the Soviet government and the Comintern, including the Communist Party of Germany (KPD) during the Third Period, accused social democracy of enabling fascism and went as far as to call social democrats "social fascists." The Social Democratic Party of Germany, under the leadership of Chancellor Hermann Müller, adopted the view that the communists and Nazis posed an equal danger to liberal democracy. In 1930, Kurt Schumacher suggested that the two movements enabled each other. He posited that the KPD, which was staunchly Stalinist, were "red-painted Nazis." After being opponents for most of the 1930s, the Soviet Union and Nazi Germany signed the Molotov–Ribbentrop Pact in August 1939. In September 1939, The New York Times published an editorial arguing that "Hitlerism is brown communism, Stalinism is red fascism. ... The world will now understand that the only real 'ideological' issue is one between democracy, liberty and peace on the one hand and despotism, terror and war on the other." During the period while the pact was in force, Mussolini positively reviewed Stalinism and came to believe that Stalin was in effect transforming Soviet Bolshevism into a Slavic fascism. The Soviet Union and Nazi Germany remained aligned for the first two years of World War II, until Hitler broke the pact by invading the USSR in 1941. Prior to this, the signing of the 1933 Treaty of Friendship, Nonaggression, and Neutrality had Fascist Italy become a major trading partner with Stalin's USSR, exchanging Soviet natural resources for Italian technical assistance, which included the fields of aviation, automobile and naval technology.

Several modern historians have tried to pay more attention to the economic, political and ideological differences between these two regimes than their similarities.

Marxist theories of fascism have seen fascism as a form of reaction to socialism and a feature of capitalism.

The 2008 documentary film The Soviet Story, commissioned by the national-conservative Union for Europe of the Nations group in the European Parliament and produced and directed by Latvian filmmaker Edvīns Šnore, compared the atrocities of the two regimes in a reminiscence of the Historikerstreit in the 1980s. In the documentary, Šnore stated that "not only were the crimes of the former inspired by the crimes of the latter, but that they helped each other, and that without their mutual assistance the outcome of World War II could have been quite different." While in Latvia, the term genocide is widely used to also refer to forced population transfer in the Soviet Union, for example, in the Commemoration Day for the Victims of Communist Genocide. This classification as genocide is still being debated in the academic literature. The Eastern European approaches of history have been incorporated in the European Union agenda, among them the Prague Declaration and the European Day of Remembrance for Victims of Stalinism and Nazism, proclaimed by the European Parliament in August 2008 and endorsed by the Organisation for Security and Co-operation in Europe (OSCE) in July 2009; it is officially known as Black Ribbon Day in some countries, including Canada. Many scholars in Western Europe have rejected the comparison of the two totalitarian regimes and the equation of their crimes. According to Mārtiņš Kaprāns, a communication science expert and researcher at the Institute of Philosophy and Sociology, University of Latvia, "[s]cholars have argued that The Soviet Story is an effective Latvian response to Russian propaganda, but it also exemplifies the broader problems of post-communist memory politics." In his memory studies article, Kaprāns wrote that "the idea of how memory work triggered by the documentary got started on social networking sites" and on "the video-sharing website YouTube and the Internet encyclopedia Wikipedia, both of which are crucial meaning-making sites with respect to history."

The 2008 Prague Declaration on European Conscience and Communism, initiated by the Czech government and signed by figures such as Václav Havel, called for "a common approach regarding crimes of totalitarian regimes, inter alia Communist regimes." It also called for "[r]eaching an all-European understanding that both the Nazi and Communist totalitarian regimes each to be judged by their own terrible merits to be destructive in their policies of systematically applying extreme forms of terror, suppressing all civic and human liberties, starting aggressive wars and, as an inseparable part of their ideologies, exterminating and deporting whole nations and groups of population; and that as such they should be considered to be the main disasters, which blighted the 20th century." In 2009, Hans-Gert Pöttering, former President of the European Parliament and Christian Democratic Union member, stated that "both totalitarian systems (Stalinism and Nazism) are comparable and terrible." The Communist Party of Greece opposed the Prague Declaration and criticised "the new escalation of the anti-communist hysteria led by the EU council, the European Commission and the political staff of the bourgeois class in the European Parliament." The Communist Party of Britain opined that the Prague Declaration "is a rehash of the persistent attempts by reactionary historians to equate Soviet Communism and Hitlerite Fascism, echoing the old slanders of British authors George Orwell and Robert Conquest."

In some Eastern European countries, the denial of both communist and Nazi crimes has been explicitly outlawed, such as in the Polish legal system and the Polish Penal Code, and Czech foreign minister Karel Schwarzenberg said that "there is a fundamental concern here that totalitarian systems be measured by the same standard." In 2010, the European Commission rejected calls for similar EU-wide legislation due to the lack of consensus among member states. A statement adopted by Russia's legislature said that comparisons of Nazism and Stalinism are "blasphemous towards all of the anti-fascist movement veterans, Holocaust victims, concentration camp prisoners and tens of millions of people ... who sacrificed their lives for the sake of the fight against the Nazis' anti-human racial theory." Earlier in 2009, Russia berated the OSCE for equating Stalin with Hitler. Konstantin Kosachyov, who headed the committee for foreign relations of the Russian State Duma, told Interfax: "This is nothing but an attempt to re-write the history of World War Two. The reaction of the parliament to this document will be immediate and it will be harsh." As reported by Deutsche Welle, "Moscow's delegation boycotted the vote on the final day of a week-long session of the OSCE's parliamentary assembly after failing to have the resolution withdrawn." Earlier in May 2009, Russian President Dmitry Medvedev arranged the formation of a special commission (dissolved in 2012) to defend Russia from what he termed "historical falsifications", and in support of the valiant Soviet role in World War II for defeating Nazi Germany, which resulted in the most World War II casualties among the war powers. British journalist and Labour Party aide Seumas Milne posited that the impact of the post-Cold War narrative that Stalin and Hitler were twin evils, and therefore communism is as monstrous as Nazism, "has been to relativise the unique crimes of Nazism, bury those of colonialism and feed the idea that any attempt at radical social change will always lead to suffering, killing and failure."

== See also ==
- Double genocide theory
- German–Soviet Axis talks
- German–Soviet economic relations (1934–1941)
- Gestapo–NKVD conferences
- Holocaust trivialisation
- List of cults of personality
- List of totalitarian regimes
- Molotov–Ribbentrop Pact negotiations
- National Bolshevism
- Nazi analogies
- Totalitarian architecture
- Stalinism and antisemitism

== Bibliography ==
- Arendt, Hannah (1958). The Origins of Totalitarianism (2nd ed.). New York: Meridian Books.
- Friedrich, Carl J.; et al., eds. (1964). Totalitarianism. [proceedings of a conference held at the American Academy of Arts and Sciences, March 1953]. New York: Grosset and Dunlap.
- Friedrich, Carl J.; Brzezinski, Zbigniew K. (1965). Totalitarian Dictatorship and Autocracy. Cambridge: Harvard University Press.
- Geyer, Michael; Fitzpatrick, Sheila (2009). Beyond Totalitarianism: Stalinism and Nazism Compared. Cambridge University Press. doi:10.1017/CBO9780511802652. ISBN 978-0-521-72397-8.
- Ghodsee, Kristen (2014). "A Tale of "Two Totalitarianisms": The Crisis of Capitalism and the Historical Memory of Communism". History of the Present. 4 (2): 115–142. doi:10.5406/historypresent.4.2.0115. JSTOR 10.5406/historypresent.4.2.0115.
- Kershaw, Ian; Lewin, Moshe, eds. (1997). Stalinism and Nazism: Dictatorships in Comparison. Cambridge University Press. doi:10.1017/CBO9780511815775. ISBN 978-0-521-56521-9.
- Kühne, Thomas (May 2012). "Great Men and Large Numbers: Undertheorising a History of Mass Killing". Contemporary European History. 21 (2): 133–143. doi:10.1017/S0960777312000070. ISSN 0960-7773. JSTOR 41485456. S2CID 143701601.
- Neumayer, Laure (2018). The Criminalisation of Communism in the European Political Space after the Cold War. Routledge. ISBN 9781351141741.
- Overy, R. J. (2004). The Dictators: Hitler's Germany and Stalin's Russia. London: Allen Lane.
- Parenti, Michael (1997). Blackshirts and Reds: Rational Fascism and the Overthrow of Communism. City Lights Books. ISBN 978-0-87286-329-3.
- Pipes, Richard (1995). Russia Under the Bolshevik Regime, 1919–1924. New York: Vintage Books, Random House.
- Rousso, Henry; Golsan, Richard Joseph, eds. (2004). Stalinism and Nazism: History and Memory Compared. U of Nebraska Press. ISBN 978-0-8032-9000-6.
- Wheatcroft, Stephen G. (1996). "The Scale and Nature of German and Soviet Repression and Mass Killings, 1930–45" (PDF). Europe-Asia Studies. 48 (8): 1319–1353. doi:10.1080/09668139608412415. JSTOR 152781.
