= Michael Geyer =

German historian

Michael Geyer is a German historian, and Samuel N. Harper Professor Emeritus of German and European History, at University of Chicago. He is the recipient of the 2012 Axel Springer Berlin Prize and Senior Fellow at the American Academy in Berlin. He graduated from Albert Ludwigs Universität Freiburg with a D.Phil.

== Works ==
- "Resistance as Ongoing Project: Visions of Order, Obligations to Strangers, Struggles for Civil Society," The Journal of Modern History Vol. 64, December 1992
- Michael Geyer and John W. Boyer, eds., Resistance against the Third Reich, 1933-1990, University of Chicago Press, 1994, ISBN 978-0-226-06958-6
- The power of intellectuals in contemporary Germany. University of Chicago Press. 2001. ISBN 978-0-226-28987-8. "michael geyer."
- "Insurrectionary Warfare: The German Debate about a Levée en Masse in October 1918," The Journal of Modern History Vol. 73, No. 3, September 2001
- Konrad Hugo Jarausch; Michael Geyer (2003). Shattered past: reconstructing German histories. Princeton University Press. ISBN 978-0-691-05936-5.
- Michael Geyer and Sheila Fitzpatrick, eds., Beyond totalitarianism: Stalinism and Nazism compared, Cambridge University Press, 2009, ISBN 978-0-521-72397-8
- Michael Geyer, ed. (2006). Die Gegenwart Gottes in der modernen Gesellschaft: Transzendenz und religiöse Vergemeinschaftung in Deutschland. Wallstein Verlag. ISBN 978-3-8353-0007-1.
