= Laure Neumayer =

French political scientist (born 1973)

- Born: 1973 (age 52–53)
- Scientific career
- Fields: Political science
- Institutions: University of Paris 1 Pantheon-Sorbonne

Laure Neumayer (born 1973) is a French political scientist. She is a maîtresse de conférences at the University of Paris 1 Pantheon-Sorbonne and a senior researcher of the Centre européen de sociologie et de science politique in Paris (CESSP). She is particularly known for her work on the politics of memory, especially related to post-communist states in Central Europe. Her early work focused on the enlargement of the European Union and the Europeanization of Central European states, and she has written on Euroscepticism. Between 1997 and 2002 Neumayer was a member of the French Centre for Social Science Research in Prague, in spring of 2002 a Junior Fellow at the Collegium Budapest-Institute for Advanced Studies, between 2013 and 2018 a junior member of the Institut Universitaire de France and a visiting scholar at the Harriman Institute of Columbia University in New York City in spring of 2018.

== Selected works ==
- The Criminalisation of Communism in the European Political Space after the Cold War, Routledge, 2019
- Criminaliser le passé ? La mémoire des passés autoritaires en Europe et en Amérique latine, co-edited with Sophie Baby and Frédéric Zalewski, Presses Universitaires de Nanterre/L’Apprimerie, 2019.
- History, Memory and Politics in Central and Eastern Europe: Memory Games, co-edited with Georges Mink, Palgrave Macmillan, 2013.
- L’Europe contestée: Espaces et enjeux des positionnements contre l’intégration européenne, co-edited with Antoine Roger and Frédéric Zalewski, Editions Michel Houdiard, 2008.
- L’Europe et ses passés douloureux, co-edited with Georges Mink, La Découverte, 2007.
- L’enjeu européen dans les transformations postcommunistes, 2006.
