= Holodomor =

1932–1933 man-made famine in Soviet Ukraine

Holodomor Голодомор
- Starved peasants on a street in Kharkiv, 1933, Ukraine's capital at the time
- Country: Soviet Union
- Location: Ukraine SSR, northern Kuban, Kazakh ASSR
- Period: 1932–1933
- Total deaths: Around 3.5 to 5 million in Ukraine; see death toll; 62,000 to "hundreds of thousands" in the Kuban; Over 300,000 Ukrainians in Kazakhstan dead or migrated
- Causes: Industrialization policy during the first five year plan; Dekulakization; Soviet collectivization of farming; Intentional starvation of Ukrainians (disputed)
- Relief: Foreign relief rejected by the state. 176,200 and 325,000 tons of grains provided by the state as food and seed aids between February and July 1933.
- Consequences: Heavy population loss in Ukraine; Kuban Ukrainian population declined from 915,000 to 150,000 between 1926 and 1939 from various causes; Population of Ukrainians in Kazakhstan shrunk by more than one third

The Holodomor, (Note: Ukrainian: Голодомор, IPA: [ɦolodoˈmɔr]; derived from морити голодом, moryty holodom, 'to kill by starvation'; also literally known as "Extermination by Hunger" or "Hunger-extermination") also known as the Ukrainian famine, (Note: Ukrainian: великий український голод, romanized: velykyi ukrainskyi holod, lit. 'great Ukrainian famine') was a massive man-made famine in Soviet Ukraine from 1932 to 1933 that killed millions of Ukrainians. The Holodomor was part of the wider Soviet famine of 1930–1933 which affected the major grain-producing areas of the Soviet Union.

While scholars agree the famine was primarily man-made, it remains in dispute whether the Holodomor was intentional, whether it was directed at Ukrainians, and whether it constitutes a genocide, the point of contention being the absence of attested documents explicitly ordering the starvation of any area in the Soviet Union. Some historians conclude that the famine was deliberately engineered by Joseph Stalin to eliminate a Ukrainian independence movement. Others suggest that the famine was primarily the consequence of collectivization of agriculture and actions taken to industrialize the Soviet economy. A middle position is that the initial causes of the famine were an unintentional byproduct of the process of collectivization but once it set in, starvation was selectively weaponized, and the famine was "instrumentalized" and amplified against Ukrainians as a means to punish them for resisting Soviet policies and to suppress their nationalist sentiments.

Ukraine was one of the largest grain-producing states in the USSR and was subject to unreasonably high grain quotas compared to the rest of the USSR in 1930. (Note: Marples 2009. "Ukrainian scholars who write most regularly on the famine, such as Yurii Shapoval ([35]), Stanislav Kul'chyts'kyi ([15], [16], [17], [18]), Vasyl Marochko ([22], [23]) and Petro Panchenko et al. ([28]), place emphasis on several factors that appear to elucidate the true causes of the famine: the rapid introduction of collectivisation in Ukraine compared to other regions; the unreasonable grain quotas placed upon Ukraine; the closure of the borders of Ukraine and the North Caucasus according to Stalin's directive of 22 January 1933 to prevent the migration of starving peasants; the fact that Ukrainian officials informed Moscow of the situation in Ukraine and the imminence of famine as early as 1932 but without any results; Stalin's letter to Kaganovich of 11 August 1932 that outlined his suspicions of the Ukrainian peasantry and his fear of 'losing Ukraine' (Davies et al.[ 4]); the fact that the Extraordinary Commission in Ukraine led by Molotov took draconian measures, with its decree of 18 November 1932, confiscating not only grain, but also meat and vegetables, ensuring the inevitability of the peasants starving; the lack of such starvation in other republics, and most specifically Russia and Byelorussia; the link between the famine and the assault on the Ukrainian nation, as manifested by terror and deportations; the purge of cultural and national leaders; and the cessation of the earlier policy of Ukrainisation.) This caused Ukraine to be hit particularly hard by the famine. Early estimates of the death toll by scholars and government officials vary greatly. A joint statement to the United Nations signed by 25 countries in November 2003 declared that 7 to 10 million people died. (Note: UN signatory nations, 2003. "In the former Soviet Union millions of men, women and children fell victims to the cruel actions and policies of the totalitarian regime. The Great Famine of 1932–1933 in Ukraine (Holodomor), which took from 7 million to 10 million innocent lives and became a national tragedy for the Ukrainian people. ... [A]s a result of civil war and forced collectivization, leaving deep scars in the consciousness of future generations. ... [W]e deplore the acts and policies that brought about mass starvation and death of millions of people. We do not want to settle scores with the past, it could not be changed, but we are convinced that exposing violations of human rights, preserving historical records and restoring the dignity of victims through acknowledgement of their suffering, will guide future societies and help to avoid similar catastrophes in the future. ...) More recent scholarship has estimated a lower range of between 3.5 and 5 million victims.

Public discussion of the famine period was banned in the Soviet Union until the glasnost reforms introduced by Mikhail Gorbachev in the 1980s. Since 2006, the Holodomor has been recognized as a genocide by Ukraine and 33 other UN member states, the European Parliament, and 35 of the 50 states of the United States. In 2008, the Russian State Duma condemned the Soviet regime "that has neglected the lives of people for the achievement of economic and political goals".

== Etymology ==
The Ukrainian word holodomor means "death by hunger", "killing by hunger", "killing by starvation", or sometimes "murder by hunger or starvation." It is a compound of the Ukrainian holod, 'hunger' and mor, 'plague'. The modern Ukrainian verb moryty (морити) means "to poison, to drive to exhaustion, or to torment", and the expression holodom moryty means "to inflict death by hunger." The perfective form of moryty is zamoryty, 'kill or drive to death'. Similar words can be found in other Slavic languages, for example, the Polish głodomór, 'hungry person' and the Czech hladomor, 'famine'. In English, the Holodomor has also been referred to as the "artificial famine", "terror-genocide", the "Ukrainian Holocaust" and the "great famine".

Before it became synonymous with Soviet famines in Ukraine, holodomor was used as a referent or occupational adjective. Until the 1970s, Ukrainian papers almost unanimously used the word in a similar manner to the Polish głodomór, that is, to refer to either a person or group of people who were starving, a person or group responsible for starvation or a person whose occupation involved starving themselves for a freak show. Mimicking their Czech colleagues' writings on the famine, Ukrainian dissidents living in 1930s Prague would often use the aforementioned hladomor to refer to the famine, but only when writing in the Czech language, not in Ukrainian. It is not fully known if, or how much, the Czech word influenced the later Ukrainian definition.

Ukrainian historians have named two different books from the 1960s as being possible originators of holodomor's modern definition. The first is Vasyl Barka's memoir novel Zhovtyi kniaz (The Yellow Prince, 1963); the second is Pavel Shtepa's political essay Moskovstvo (1968), which uses the word to mean a deliberate policy of starvation (in relation to Soviet policy). Whatever the case, Ukrainian diaspora publications from the 1970s began using holodomor more and more, alongside holodomorstvo and narodovbyvstvo, to refer to the famine or policies that led to the famine. By the 1980s, holodomor had become the standard phrase within the Ukrainian diaspora to refer to the genocidal interpretation of the 1932-33 famine.

In the Soviet Union, of which Ukraine was a constituent republic, any references to the famine were dismissed as anti-Soviet propaganda, even after de-Stalinization in 1956, until the declassification and publication of historical documents in the late 1980s made continued denial of the catastrophe unsustainable. Discussion of the Holodomor became possible as part of the Soviet glasnost ("openness") policy in the 1980s. In Ukraine, holodomor was first used by Ivan Drach, in his speech to the IX Congress of Writers in the summer of 1986. The first Ukrainian official to use the word 'famine' openly in relation to the Holodomor was Volodymyr Shcherbytsky, First Secretary of the Central Committee of the Communist Party of Ukraine, who used it in a December 1987 speech on the occasion of the republic's 70th anniversary. Another early public usage in the Soviet Union was in a February 1988 speech by Oleksiy Musiyenko, Deputy Secretary for ideological matters of the party organisation of the Kyiv branch of the Union of Soviet Writers in Ukraine.

The term holodomor may have first appeared in print in the Soviet Union on 18 July 1988, when Musiyenko's article on the topic was published. Ukrainian historian Georgiy Kasianov believes that the capitalised form, Holodomor, was first used in a March 2003 publication from a Ukrainian parliamentary committee, followed by a similar reference later that year in the United Nations joint statement. An entry in the modern, two-volume dictionary of the Ukrainian language, published in 2004, described holodomor as "artificial hunger, organised on a vast scale by a criminal regime against a country's population."

=== Controversies ===
Historians Stanislav Kulchytsky and Grzegorz Rossoliński-Liebe have harshly criticised the use of the phrase "Ukrainian Holocaust", first coined by Vasyl Hryshko in 1978, to refer to the Holodomor. Kulchytsky has written that Ukraine "does not have the moral right to employ the concept", and that the phrase conflates Jewish and Ukrainian suffering, ultimately over-politicising the Holodomor. Rossoliński-Liebe, on the other hand, has accused those who use the term of attempting to downplay the Holocaust and distract from Ukrainian participation in the Holocaust. According to Liebe, articles on the famine from Ukrainian publications, often referring to the "Ukrainian Holocaust", began to appear more and more after the 1978 broadcast of the Holocaust miniseries in the US.

According to Elazar Barkan, Elizabeth A. Cole, and Kai Struve, the reason why Holodomor, a word that shares the first four letters of holocaust, has been so widely adopted is because influential Ukrainian anti-communists wanted to draw parallels from the 1932-33 famine to the Holocaust. The term has been criticized by these and other academics, as the Holocaust was a heavily documented, coordinated effort by Nazi Germany and its collaborators to eliminate certain ethnic groups such as Jews. By contrast, there is no definitive documentation that Stalin directly ordered the mass murder of Ukrainians. Barkan et al. state that the term Holodomor was "introduced and popularized by the Ukrainian diaspora in North America before Ukraine became independent" and that the term 'Holocaust' in reference to the famine "is not explained at all."

== History ==
=== Scope and duration ===
The famine affected the Ukrainian SSR, including the Moldavian Autonomous Soviet Socialist Republic (MASSR), which was a part of it, in spring 1932 and from February to July 1933, with the most victims recorded in spring 1933. In 1929 and 1930, over 3,000 peasant households had been nationalised with their goods confiscated. The authorities deliberately continued the grain requisitions, leaving the population without means of subsistence. Due to starvation, approximately 20,000 people died in the MASSR during the 1932–1933 period. The consequences are evident in demographic statistics: between 1926 and 1939, the Ukrainian population increased by only 6.6%, whereas Russia and Belarus grew by 16.9% and 11.7% respectively. The number of Ukrainians by ethnicity decreased by 10%.

From the 1932 harvest, Soviet authorities were able to procure only 4.3 million tons of grain, as compared with 7.2 million tons obtained from the 1931 harvest. Rations in towns were drastically cut back, and in winter 1932–1933 and spring 1933, people in many urban areas starved. Urban workers were supplied by a rationing system and therefore could occasionally assist their starving relatives in the countryside, but rations were gradually cut. By spring 1933, urban residents also faced starvation. It is estimated 70% to 80% of all famine deaths during the Holodomor in eight analyzed Oblasts in the Soviet Union occurred in the first seven months of 1933.

The first reports of mass malnutrition and deaths from starvation emerged from two urban areas of the city of Uman, reported in January 1933 by Vinnytsia and Kyiv oblasts. By mid-January 1933, there were reports about mass "difficulties" with food in urban areas, which had been undersupplied through the rationing system, and deaths from starvation among people who were refused rations, according to the December 1932 decree of the Central Committee of the Ukrainian Communist Party. By the beginning of February 1933, according to reports from local authorities and Ukrainian GPU (secret police), the most affected area was Dnipropetrovsk Oblast, which also suffered from epidemics of typhus and malaria. Odesa and Kyiv oblasts were second and third respectively. By mid-March, most of the reports of starvation originated from Kyiv Oblast.

By mid-April 1933, Kharkiv Oblast reached the top of the most affected list, while Kyiv, Dnipropetrovsk, Odesa, Vinnytsia, and Donetsk oblasts, and Moldavian SSR were next on the list. Reports about mass deaths from starvation, dated mid-May through the beginning of June 1933, originated from raions in Kyiv and Kharkiv oblasts. The "less affected" list noted Chernihiv Oblast and northern parts of Kyiv and Vinnytsia oblasts. The Central Committee of the CP(b) of Ukraine Decree of 8 February 1933 said no hunger cases should have remained untreated. The Ukrainian Weekly, which was tracking the situation in 1933, reported the difficulties in communications and the appalling situation in Ukraine.

Local authorities had to submit reports about the numbers suffering from hunger, the reasons for hunger, number of deaths from hunger, food aid provided from local sources, and centrally provided food aid required. The GPU managed parallel reporting and food assistance in the Ukrainian SSR. Many regional reports and most of the central summary reports are available from present-day central and regional Ukrainian archives.

=== Causes ===
Soviet grain collections and exports (in thousand tons)
| Year ending | Collections | Exports |
|---|---|---|
| June 1930 | 16081 | 1343 |
| June 1931 | 22139 | 5832 |
| June 1932 | 22839 | 4786 |
| June 1933 | 18513 | 1607 |

Olga Andriewsky writes that scholars are in consensus that the cause of the famine was man-made. The term "man-made" is, however, questioned by historians such as R. W. Davies and Stephen Wheatcroft, according to whom those who use this term "underestimate the role of ... natural causes", though they agree that the Holodomor was largely a result of Stalin's economic policies. Among contemporary historians it is debated whether the famine was an intended result of such policies, whether the Holodomor was directed at Ukrainians, and whether it constitutes a genocide, the point of contention being the absence of attested documents explicitly ordering the starvation of any area in the Soviet Union. Some historians conclude that the famine was deliberately engineered by Joseph Stalin to eliminate a Ukrainian independence movement. (Note: Britannica "Holodomor". "The Great Famine (Holodomor) of 1932–1933 – a man-made demographic catastrophe unprecedented in peacetime. Of the estimated six to eight million people who died in the Soviet Union, about four to five million were Ukrainians ... Its deliberate nature is underscored by the fact that no physical basis for famine existed in Ukraine ... Soviet authorities set requisition quotas for Ukraine at an impossibly high level. Brigades of special agents were dispatched to Ukraine to assist in procurement, and homes were routinely searched and foodstuffs confiscated ... The rural population was left with insufficient food to feed itself.) Others suggest that the famine was primarily the consequence of rapid Soviet industrialisation and collectivization of agriculture. A middle position, held for example by historian Andrea Graziosi, is that the initial causes of the famine were an unintentional byproduct of the process of collectivization but once it set in, starvation was selectively weaponized and the famine was "instrumentalized" and amplified against Ukrainians as a means to punish Ukrainians for resisting Soviet policies and to suppress their nationalist sentiments.

Some scholars suggest that the famine was a consequence of human-made and natural factors. The most prevalent man-made factor was changes made to agriculture because of rapid industrialisation during the First Five Year Plan. There are also those who blame a systematic set of policies perpetrated by the Soviet government under Stalin designed to exterminate the Ukrainians.

==== Low harvest ====
According to historian Stephen G. Wheatcroft, the grain yield for the Soviet Union preceding the famine was a low harvest of between 55 and 60 million tons, likely in part caused by damp weather and low traction power, yet official statistics mistakenly reported a yield of 68.9 million tons. (A single ton of grain is enough to provide a good bread ration containing c. 2350 kCal per person for three people for one year.) Historian Mark Tauger has suggested that drought and damp weather were causes of the low harvest. Mark Tauger suggested that heavy rains would help the harvest while Stephen Wheatcroft suggested it would hurt it, which Natalya Naumenko notes as a disagreement in scholarship. Another factor which reduced the harvest suggested by Tauger included endemic plant rust. However, in regard to plant disease, Stephen Wheatcroft notes that the Soviet extension of sown area combined with lack of crop rotation may have exacerbated the problem, (Note: Davies, Wheatcroft 2004, (page 437). "It was not until the autumn of 1932 that the restoration of proper crop rotation received the strong support of the authorities (see pp. 231–4). Meanwhile, much damage had been done. Such a dramatic expansion of sown area and reduction of fallow, without improved crop rotation and the careful introduction of alternative means for rejuvenating the soil with fertilisers or manure, was bound to lead to the reduction of yields and an increased likelihood of crop diseases. By 1932, in many regions, and particularly in Ukraine, soil exhaustion and crop diseases were widespread.") which Tauger also acknowledges in regard to the latter.

==== Collectivization, procurements, and the export of grain ====
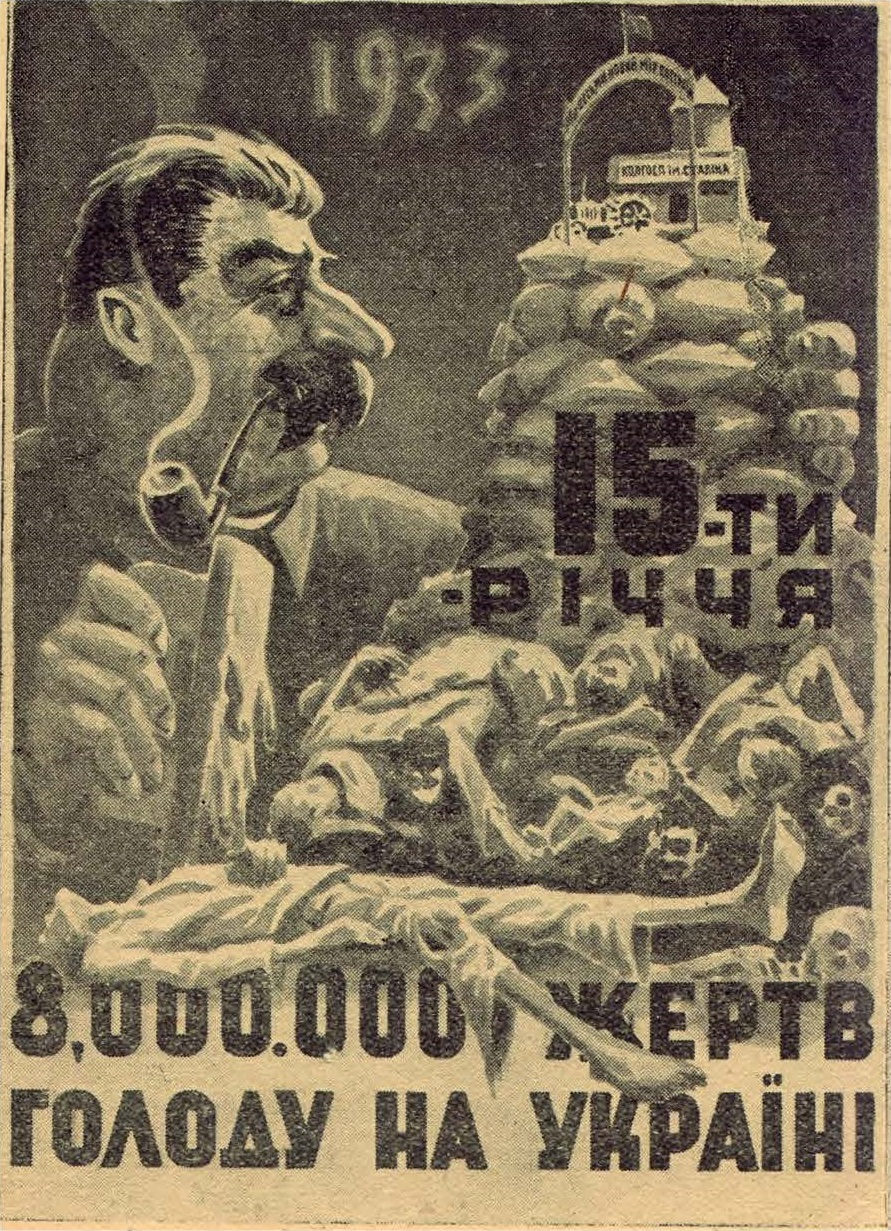
Postcard commemorating the 15th anniversary of the Holodomor, which shows Stalin looking at his kolkhoz built on a pile of starved Ukrainians. Published in 1948 by the Ukrainian Youth Association.

Due to factional struggles with the Bukharin wing of the party, peasant resistance to the NEP under Lenin, and the need for industrialization, Joseph Stalin declared a need to extract a "tribute" or "tax" from the peasantry. This idea was supported by most of the party in the 1920s. The tribute collected by the party took on the form of a virtual war against the peasantry that would lead to its cultural destruction and the relegating of the countryside to essentially a colony homogenized to the urban culture of the Soviet elite. Leon Trotsky, however, opposed the policy of forced collectivisation under Stalin and would have favoured a voluntary, gradual approach towards collective farming with greater tolerance for the rights of Soviet Ukrainians. This campaign of "colonizing" the peasantry had its roots both in old Russian Imperialism and modern social engineering of the nation state yet with key differences to the latter such as Soviet repression reflecting more the weakness of said state rather than its strength.

In this vein, by the summer of 1930, the government instituted a program of food requisitioning, ostensibly to increase grain exports. According to Natalya Naumenko, collectivization in the Soviet Union and lack of favored industries were primary contributors to famine mortality (52% of excess deaths), and some evidence shows there was discrimination against ethnic Ukrainians and Germans. In Ukraine collectivisation policy was enforced, entailing extreme crisis and contributing to the famine. In 1929–1930, peasants were induced to transfer land and livestock to state-owned farms, on which they would work as day-labourers for payment in kind.

Food exports continued during the famine, albeit at a reduced rate. Michael Ellman states that the 1932–1933 grain exports amounted to 1.8 million tonnes, which would have been enough to feed 5 million people for one year. The collectivization and high procurement quota explanation for the famine is somewhat called into question by the fact that the oblasts of Ukraine with the highest losses were Kyiv and Kharkiv, which produced far smaller amounts of grain than other parts of the country. Historian Stephen G. Wheatcroft lists four problems Soviet authorities ignored during collectivization that would hinder the advancement of agricultural technology and ultimately contributed to the famine:

- "Over-extension of the sown area" — Crops yields were reduced and likely some plant disease caused by the planting of future harvests across a wider area of land without rejuvenating soil leading to the reduction of fallow land.
- "Decline in draught power" — the overextraction of grain led to the loss of food for farm animals, which in turn reduced the effectiveness of agricultural operations.
- "Quality of cultivation" — the planting and extracting of the harvest, along with ploughing, was done in a poor manner due to inexperienced and demoralized workers and the aforementioned lack of draught power.
- "The poor weather" — drought and other poor weather conditions were largely ignored by Soviet authorities, who gambled on good weather and believed agricultural difficulties would be overcome.

Mark Tauger notes that Soviet and Western specialists at the time noted draught power shortages and lack of crop rotation contributed to intense weed infestations, with these both being also factors Stephen Wheatcroft lists as contributing to the famine. Natalya Naumenko calculated that reduced agriculture production in "collectivized" collective farms is responsible for up to 52% of Holodomor excess deaths.

==== Discrimination and persecution of Ukrainians ====
At every [train] station there was a crowd of peasants in rags, offering icons and linen in exchange for a loaf of bread. The women were lifting up their infants to the compartment windows—infants pitiful and terrifying with limbs like sticks, puffed bellies, big cadaverous heads lolling on thin necks.

— Arthur Koestler, Hungarian-British journalist

It has been proposed that the Soviet leadership used the human-made famine to attack Ukrainian nationalism, and thus it could fall under the legal definition of genocide. For example, special and particularly lethal policies were adopted in and largely limited to Soviet Ukraine at the end of 1932 and 1933. According to Timothy Snyder, "each of them may seem like an anodyne (Note: Anodyne is an old term for painkiller. In the quote's context, "anodyne administrative measure" means a measure meant to calm the hungry crowds rather than solving the problem itself (see anodyne in Wiktionary).) administrative measure, and each of them was certainly presented as such at the time, and yet each had to kill." Other sources discuss the famine in relation to a project of imperialism or colonialism of Ukraine by the Soviet state.

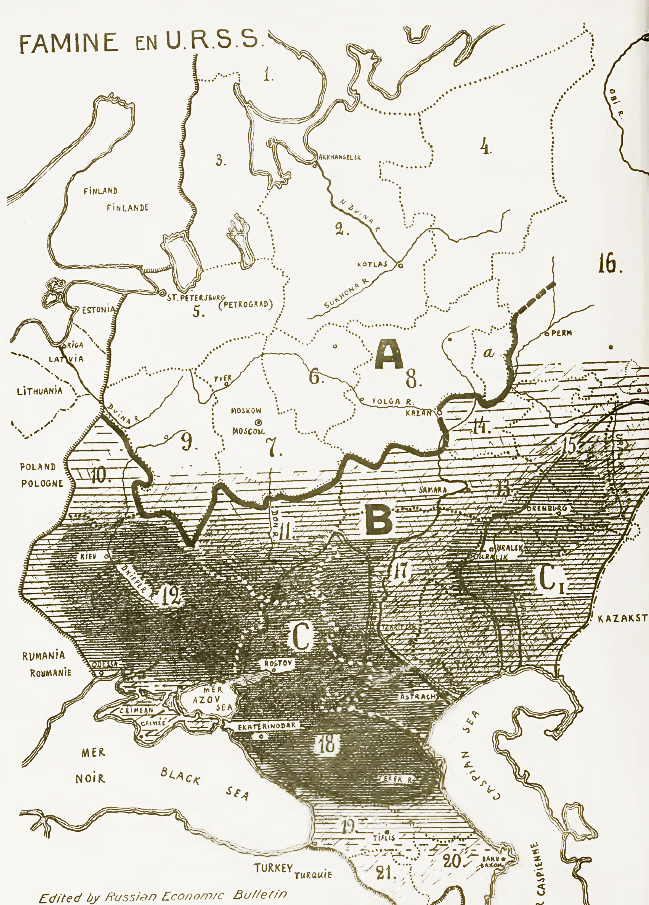
A map of the Soviet famine of 1932–1933 with the areas of most disastrous famine shaded black

According to a Centre for Economic Policy Research paper published in 2021 by Andrei Markevich, Natalya Naumenko, and Nancy Qian, regions with higher Ukrainian population shares were struck harder with centrally planned policies corresponding to famine such as increased procurement rate, and Ukrainian populated areas were given lower numbers of tractors which the paper argues demonstrates that ethnic discrimination across the board was centrally planned, ultimately concluding that 92% of famine deaths in Ukraine alone along with 77% of famine deaths in Ukraine, Russia, and Belarus combined can be explained by systematic bias against Ukrainians. The paper found from its analysis that "the regime intended to take more grain from Ukrainian areas after conditioning for factors such as production capacity" and noting that "in areas that the Bolshevik regime marked as important for grain production, ethnic Russians replaced ethnic Ukrainians as the largest ethnic group".

Mark Tauger criticized Natalya Naumenko's work as being based on: "major historical inaccuracies and falsehoods, omissions of essential evidence contained in her sources or easily available, and substantial misunderstandings of certain key topics". For example, Naumenko ignored Tauger's findings of 8.94 million tons of the harvest that had been lost to crop "rust and smut", four reductions in grain procurement to Ukraine including a 39.5 million puds reduction in grain procurements ordered by Stalin, and that from Tauger's findings which are contrary to Naumenko's paper's claims the "per-capita grain procurements in Ukraine were less, often significantly less, than the per-capita procurements from the five other main grain-producing regions in the USSR in 1932".

Other scholars argue that in other years preceding the famine this was not the case. For example, Stanislav Kulchytsky claims Ukraine produced more grain in 1930 than the Central Black Earth Oblast, Middle and Lower Volga and North Caucasus regions all together, which had never been done before, and on average gave 4.7 quintals of grain from every sown hectare to the state—a record-breaking index of marketability—but was unable to fulfill the grain quota for 1930 until May 1931. Ukraine produced a similar amount of grain in 1931; however, by the late spring of 1932 "many districts were left with no reserves of produce or fodder at all". Despite this, according to statistics gathered by Nataliia Levchuk, Ukraine and North Caucasus Krai delivered almost 100% of their grain procurement in 1931 versus 67% in two Russian Oblasts during the same period versus 1932 where three Russian regions delivered almost all of their procurements and Ukraine and North Caucasus did not. This can partially be explained by Ukrainian regions losing a third of their harvests and Russian regions losing by comparison only 15% of their harvest.

Ultimately, Tauger states: "if the regime had not taken even that smaller amount grain from Ukrainian villages, the famine could have been greatly reduced or even eliminated" however (in his words) "if the regime had left that grain in Ukraine, then other parts of the USSR would have been even more deprived of food than they were, including Ukrainian cities and industrial sites, and the overall effect would still have been a major famine, even worse in "non-Ukrainian" regions." In fact in contrast to Naumenko's paper's claims the higher Ukrainian collectivization rates in Tauger's opinion actually indicate a pro-Ukrainian bias in Soviet policies rather than an anti-Ukrainian one: "[Soviet authorities] did not see collectivization as "discrimination" against Ukrainians; they saw it as a reflection of—in the leaders' view—Ukraine's relatively more advanced farming skills that made Ukraine better prepared for collectivization (Davies 1980a, 166, 187–188; Tauger 2006a)."

Naumenko responded to some of Tauger's criticisms in another paper. Naumenko criticizes Tauger's view of the efficacy of collective farms arguing Tauger's view goes against the consensus, she also states that the tenfold difference in death toll between the 1932-1933 Soviet famine and the Russian famine of 1891–1892 can only be explained by government policies, and that the infestations of pests and plant disease suggested by Tauger as a cause of the famine must also correspond such infestations to rates of collectivization due to deaths by area corresponding to this due Naumenko's findings that: "on average, if you compare two regions with similar pre-famine characteristics, one with zero collectivization rate and another with a 100 percent collectivization rate, the more collectivized region's 1933 mortality rate increases by 58 per thousand relative to its 1927–1928 mortality rate". Naumenko believes the disagreement between her and Tauger is due to a "gulf in training and methods between quantitative fields like political science and economics and qualitative fields like history" noting that Tauger makes no comments on one of her paper's results section.

Tauger made a counter-reply to this reply by Naumenko. Tauger argues in his counter reply that Naumenko's attempt to correspond collectivization rates to famine mortality fails because "there was no single level of collectivization anywhere in the USSR in 1930, especially in the Ukrainian Republic" and that "since collectivization changed significantly by 1932–1933, any connection between 1930 and 1933 omits those changes and is therefore invalid". Tauger also criticizes Naumenko's ignoring of statistics Tauger's presented where "in her reply she completely ignored the quantitative data [Tauger] presented in [his] article" in which she against the evidence "denied that any famines took place in the later 1920s". To counter Naumenko's claim that collectivization explains the famine Tauger argues ( in his words) how agro-environmental disasters better explain the regional discrepancies: "[Naumenko's] calculations again omit any consideration of the agro-environmental disasters that harmed farm production in 1932. In her appendices, Table C3, she does the same calculation with collectivization data from 1932, which she argues shows a closer correlation between collectivization and famine mortality (Naumenko 2021b, 33). Yet, as I showed, those agroenvironmental disasters were much worse in the regions with higher collectivization—especially Ukraine, the North Caucasus, and the Volga River basin (and also in Kazakhstan)—than elsewhere in the USSR. As I documented in my article and other publications, these were regions that had a history of environmental disasters that caused crop failures and famines repeatedly in Russian history." Tauger notes: "[Naumenko's] assumption that collectivization subjected peasants to higher procurements, but in 1932 in Ukraine this was clearly not the case" as "grain procurements both total and per-capita were much lower in Ukraine than anywhere else in the USSR in 1932".

==== Peasant resistance ====
Collectivization in the Soviet Union, including the Ukrainian SSR, was not popular among the peasantry, and forced collectivisation led to numerous peasant revolts. The OGPU recorded 932 disturbances in Ukraine, 173 in the North Caucasus, and only 43 in the Central Black Earth Oblast (out of 1,630 total). Reports two years prior recorded over 4,000 unrests in Ukraine, while in other agricultural regions - Central Black Earth, Middle Volga, Lower Volga, and North Caucasus - the numbers were sightly above 1,000. OGPU's summaries also cited public proclamations of Ukrainian insurgents to restore the independence of Ukraine, while reports by the Ukrainian officials included information about the declining popularity and authority of the party among peasants. Oleh Wolowyna comments that peasant resistance and the ensuing repression of said resistance was a critical factor for the famine in Ukraine and parts of Russia populated by national minorities like Germans and Ukrainians allegedly tainted by "fascism and bourgeois nationalism" according to Soviet authorities.

=== Regional variation ===
The collectivization and high procurement quota explanation for the famine is called into question by the fact that the oblasts of Ukraine with the highest losses were Kyiv and Kharkiv, which produced far lower amounts of grain than other sections of the country. A potential explanation for this was that Kharkiv and Kyiv fulfilled and over fulfilled their grain procurements in 1930 which led to raions in these oblasts having their procurement quotas doubled in 1931 compared to the national average increase in procurement rate of 9%. While Kharkiv and Kyiv had their quotas increased, the Odesa oblast and some raions of Dnipropetrovsk oblast had their procurement quotas decreased.

According to Nataliia Levchuk of the Ptoukha Institute of Demography and Social Studies, "the distribution of the largely increased 1931 grain quotas in Kharkiv and Kyiv oblasts by raion was very uneven and unjustified because it was done disproportionally to the percentage of wheat sown area and their potential grain capacity."

Famine losses by region
| Oblast | Total Deaths (1932–1934 in thousands) | Deaths per 1000 (1932) | Deaths per 1000 (1933) | Deaths per 1000 (1934) |
|---|---|---|---|---|
| Kyiv Oblast | 1,110.8 | 13.7 | 178.7 | 7 |
| Kharkiv Oblast | 1,037.6 | 7.8 | 178.9 | 4.2 |
| Vinnytsia Oblast | 545.5 | 5.9 | 114.6 | 5.2 |
| Dnipropetrovsk Oblast | 368.4 | 5.4 | 91.6 | 4.7 |
| Odesa Oblast | 326.9 | 6.1 | 98.8 | 2.4 |
| Chernihiv Oblast | 254.2 | 6 | 75.7 | 11.9 |
| Stalino Oblast | 230.8 | 7 | 41.1 | 6.4 |
| Tyraspol | 68.3 | 9.6 | 102.4 | 8.1 |

=== Repressive policies ===
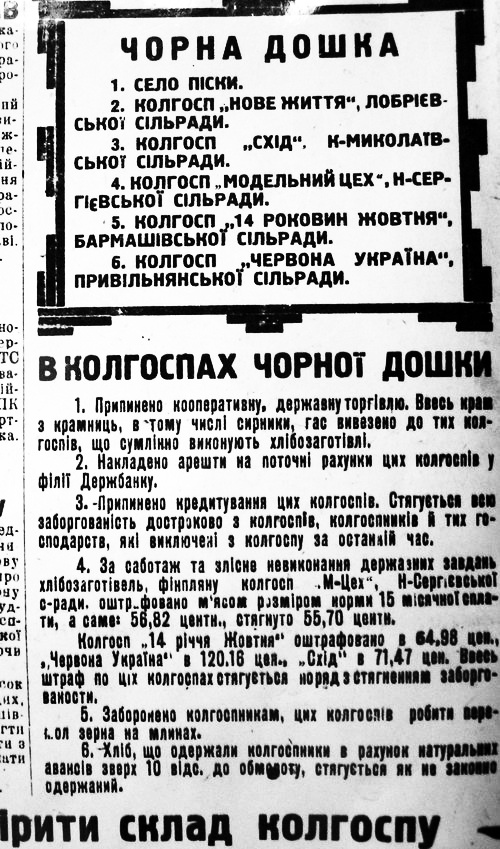
A "black board" published in the newspaper "Under the Flag of Lenin" in January 1933—a "blacklist" identifying specific kolhozes and their punishment in the Bashtanka Raion, Mykolaiv Oblast, Ukraine.

Several repressive policies were implemented in Ukraine immediately preceding, during, and proceeding the famine, including but not limited to cultural-religious persecution the Law of Spikelets, Blacklisting, the internal passport system, and harsh grain requisitions.

==== Preceding the famine ====
Coiner of the term genocide, Raphael Lemkin considered the repression of the Orthodox Church to be a prong of genocide against Ukrainians when seen in correlation to the Holodomor famine. Collectivization did not just entail the acquisition of land from farmers but also the closing of churches, burning of icons, and the arrests of priests. Associating the church with the tsarist regime, the Soviet state continued to undermine the church through expropriations and repression. They cut off state financial support to the church and secularized church schools.

By early 1930 75% of the Autocephalist parishes in Ukraine were persecuted by Soviet authorities. The GPU instigated a show trial which denounced the Orthodox Church in Ukraine as a "nationalist, political, counter-revolutionary organization" and instigated a staged "self-dissolution." However the Church was later allowed to reorganize in December 1930 under a pro-Soviet cosmopolitan leader of Ivan Pavlovsky yet purges of the Church reignited during the Great Purge. Changes in cultural politics also occurred.

First soviet show trial in Ukraine in connection to the member of the Ukrainian Socialist-Revolutionary Party has taken place as early as 1921. Yet, the first show trial related to Ukraine in the period of the First five-year plan was a trial in 1928 in North Caucasus Krai, known as Shakhty Trial. Prior to this in October 1925 Shakhty Okrug (previously part of Donets Governorate) was transferred from Ukrainian SSR to RSFSR and thus the trial was held in Moscow.Yet, one of the central ones, was the "Union for the Freedom of Ukraine" Trial in which 45 intellectuals, higher education professors, writers, a theologian and a priest were publicly prosecuted in Kharkiv, then capital of Soviet Ukraine. Fifteen of the accused were executed, and 248 with links to the defendants were sent to the camps. Ukrainian Youth Association was also considered a "sub-division" of the "Union for Freedom of Ukraine" and thus its members were also trialed. Other notable Ukrainian processes included "People's Revolutionary Socialist Party" trial in 1930 (it was claimed that this was an illegal armed insurgent organisation created in December 1929, which existed in Ukraine and Chechnya) and "Ukrainian National Center" trial in 1931 (another non-existent counter-revolutionary organisation). In RSFSR at that time some other show trials such as Industrial Party Trial (1930) and the 1931 Menshevik Trial were held. The total number is not known, but tens of thousands (Note: Werth, 2008. "And while hunger hit the peasants harder than any other group, resulting in the death of millions in atrocious conditions, another form of repression, of a police nature, struck others in Ukraine at the same moment — the political and intellectual elites, from village teachers to national leaders, via the intelligentsia. Tens of thousands of Ukrainians were arrested and punished with camp sentences") of people are estimated to have been arrested, exiled, and/or executed during and after the trial including 30,000 intellectuals, writers, teachers, and scientists.

==== During the famine ====
The "Decree About the Protection of Socialist Property", nicknamed by the farmers the Law of Spikelets, was enacted on 7 August 1932. The purpose of the law was to protect the property of the kolkhoz collective farms. It was nicknamed the Law of Spikelets because it allowed people to be prosecuted for gleaning leftover grain from the fields. There were more than 200,000 people sentenced under this law.

Stalin wrote a letter to Lazar Kaganovich on 11 September 1932, shortly before Kaganovich and Vyacheslav Molotov were appointed heads of special commissions to oversee the grain procurements in Ukraine and Kuban (a region populated primarily by ethnic Ukrainians at the time), in which Stalin urged Kaganovich to force Ukraine into absolute compliance:

The main thing is now Ukraine. Matters in Ukraine are now extremely bad. Bad from the standpoint of the Party line. They say that there are two oblasts of Ukraine (Kyiv and Dnipropetrovs'k, it seems) where almost 50 raikomy [district Party committees] have come out against the plan of grain procurements, considering them unrealistic. In other raikomy, they confirm, the matter is no better. What does this look like? This is no party, but a parliament, a caricature of a parliament. Instead of directing the districts, Kosior is always waffling between the directives of the CC VKP(b) and the demands of the district Party committees and waffled to the end. Lenin was right, when he said that a person who lacks the courage at the necessary moment to go against the current cannot be a real Bolshevik leader. Bad from the standpoint of the Soviet [state] line. Chubar is no leader. Bad from the standpoint of the GPU. Redens lacks the energy to direct the struggle with the counterrevolution in such a big and unique republic as Ukraine. If we do not now correct the situation in Ukraine, we could lose Ukraine. Consider that Piłsudski is not daydreaming, and his agents in Ukraine are much stronger than Redens or Kosior imagine. Also consider that within the Ukrainian Communist Party (500,000 members, ha, ha) there are not a few (yes, not a few!) rotten elements that are conscious or unconscious Petliura adherents and in the final analysis agents of Pilsudski. If the situation gets any worse, these elements won't hesitate to open a front within (and outside) the Party, against the Party. Worst of all, the Ukrainian leadership doesn't see these dangers.... Set yourself the task of turning Ukraine in the shortest possible time into a fortress of the USSR, into the most inalienable republic. Don't worry about money for this purpose.

The blacklist system was formalized in 1932 by the 20 November decree "The Struggle against Kurkul Influence in Collective Farms"; blacklisting, synonymous with a board of infamy, was one of the elements of agitation-propaganda in the Soviet Union, and especially Ukraine and the ethnically Ukrainian Kuban region in the 1930s. A blacklisted collective farm, village, or raion (district) had its monetary loans and grain advances called in, stores closed, grain supplies, livestock, and food confiscated as a penalty, and was cut off from trade. Its Communist Party and collective farm committees were purged and subject to arrest, and their territory was forcibly cordoned off by the OGPU secret police.

Although nominally targeting collective farms failing to meet grain quotas and independent farmers with outstanding tax-in-kind, in practice the punishment was applied to all residents of affected villages and raions, including teachers, tradespeople, and children. In the end 37 out of 392 districts along with at least 400 collective farms where put on the "black board" in Ukraine, more than half of the blacklisted farms being in Dnipropetrovsk Oblast alone. Every single raion in Dnipropetrovsk had at least one blacklisted village, and in Vinnytsia oblast five entire raions were blacklisted. This oblast is situated right in the middle of traditional lands of the Zaporizhian Cossacks. Cossack villages were also blacklisted in the Volga and Kuban regions of Russia. Some blacklisted areas in Kharkiv could have death rates exceeding 40% while in other areas such as Vinnytsia blacklisting had no particular effect on mortality.

The passport system in the Soviet Union (identity cards) was introduced on 27 December 1932 to deal with the exodus of peasants from the countryside. Individuals not having such a document could not leave their homes on pain of administrative penalties, such as internment in labour camps (Gulag). On 22 January 1933, Joseph Stalin signed a secret decree restricting travel by peasants after requests for bread began in the Kuban and Ukraine. Soviet authorities blamed the exodus of peasants during the famine on anti-Soviet elements, saying that "like the outflow from Ukraine last year, was organized by the enemies of Soviet power." (Note: Martin 2001, pp. 306-307. "TsK VKP/b/ and Sovnarkom have received information that in the Kuban and Ukraine a massive outflow of peasants 'for bread' has begun into Belorussia and the Central-Black Earth, Volga, Western, and Moscow regions. / TsK VKP/b/ and Sovnarkom do not doubt that the outflow of peasants, like the outflow from Ukraine last year, was organized by the enemies of Soviet power, the SRs and the agents of Poland, with the goal of agitation 'through the peasantry' ... TsK VKP/b/ and Sovnarkom order the OGPU of Belorussia and the Central-Black Earth, Middle Volga, Western and Moscow regions to immediately arrest all 'peasants' of Ukraine and the North Caucasus who have broken through into the north and, after separating out the counterrevolutionariy elements, to return the rest to their place of residence.' ... Molotov, Stalin)

There was a wave of migration due to starvation and authorities responded by introducing a requirement that passports be used to go between republics and banning travel by rail. During March 1933 GPU reported that 219,460 people were either intercepted and escorted back or arrested at its checkpoints meant to prevent movement of peasants between districts. It has been estimated that there were some 150,000 excess deaths as a result of this policy, and one historian asserts that these deaths constitute a crime against humanity. In contrast, historian Stephen Kotkin argues that the sealing of the Ukrainian borders caused by the internal passport system was in order to prevent the spread of famine-related diseases.

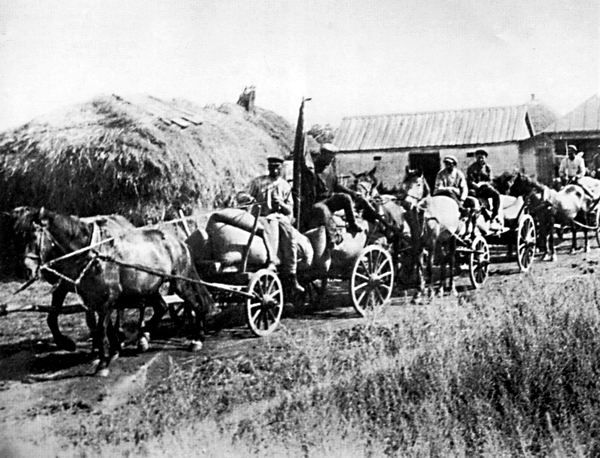
A "Red Train" of carts from the "Wave of Proletarian Revolution" collective farm in the village of Oleksiyivka, Kharkiv oblast in 1932. "Red Trains" took the first harvest of the season's crop to the government depots. During the Holodomor, these brigades were part of the Soviet Government's policy of taking away food from the peasants.

Between January and mid-April 1933, a factor contributing to a surge of deaths within certain regions of Ukraine during the period was the relentless search for alleged hidden grain by the confiscation of all food stuffs from certain households, which Stalin implicitly approved of through a telegram he sent on 1 January 1933 to the Ukrainian government reminding Ukrainian farmers of the severe penalties for not surrendering grain they may be hiding.

On the other hand, considerable grain reserves were held back by the Soviet government. By 1 July 1933, around 1,141,000 tons of grain were kept in partially secret reserves which the government did not want to touch. Stephen Wheatcroft, Mark Tauger, and R.W. Davies conclude: "it seems certain that, if Stalin had risked lower levels of these reserves in spring and summer 1933, hundreds of thousands – perhaps millions – of lives could have been saved".

In order to make up for unfulfilled grain procurement quotas in Ukraine, reserves of grain were confiscated from three sources including, according to Oleh Wolowyna, "(a) grain set side for seed for the next harvest; (b) a grain fund for emergencies; (c) grain issued to collective farmers for previously completed work, which had to be returned if the collective farm did not fulfill its quota."

==== Near the end of and after the famine ====
In Ukraine, there was a widespread purge of Communist party officials at all levels. According to Oleh Wolowyna, 390 "anti-Soviet, counter-revolutionary insurgent and chauvinist" groups were eliminated resulting in 37,797 arrests, that led to 719 executions, 8,003 people being sent to Gulag camps, and 2,728 being put into internal exile. 120,000 individuals in Ukraine were reviewed in the first 10 months of 1933 in a top-to-bottom purge of the Communist party resulting in 23% being eliminated as perceived class hostile elements. Pavel Postyshev was set in charge of placing people at the head of Machine-Tractor Stations in Ukraine which were responsible for purging elements deemed to be class hostile. The secretary of the Kharkiv Oblast referred to "bourgeois-nationalistic rabble" as "class enemies" even near the end of the famine. By the end of 1933, 60% of the heads of village councils and raion committees in Ukraine were replaced with an additional 40,000 lower-tier workers being purged.

Bandura is a traditional Ukrainian musical instrument, whereas bandurists were the carriers of traditional songs and folklore. One of the communist newspapers in 1930 already stated that "being in love with nationalist romance is not a communist thing" and in December 1933 during the All-Ukrainian Union of Art Workers, the bandura and kobza were declared class-enemy instruments, which lead to the beginning of the repressions against the musicians playing them.

Despite the crisis, the Soviet government refused to ask for foreign aid for the famine and persistently denied the famine's existence. What aid was given was selectively distributed to preserve the collective farm system. Grain producing oblasts in Ukraine such as Dnipropetrovsk were given more aid at an earlier time than more severely affected regions like Kharkiv which produced less grain. Joseph Stalin had quoted Vladimir Lenin during the famine declaring: "He who does not work, neither shall he eat."

This perspective is argued by Michael Ellman to have influenced official policy during the famine, with those deemed to be idlers being disfavored in aid distribution as compared to those deemed "conscientiously working collective farmers". In this vein, Olga Andriewsky states that Soviet archives indicate that the most productive workers were prioritized for receiving food aid. (Note: Andriewsky 2015, (page 17). "Finally, new studies have revealed the very selective — indeed, highly politicized — nature of state assistance in Ukraine in 1932–1933. Soviet authorities, as we know, took great pains to guarantee the supply of food to the industrial workforce and to certain other categories of the population — Red Army personnel and their families, for example. As the latest research has shown, however, in the spring of 1933, famine relief itself became an ideological instrument. The aid that was provided in rural Ukraine at the height of the Famine, when much of the population was starving, was directed, first and foremost, to 'conscientious' collective farm workers — those who had worked the highest number of workdays. Rations, as the sources attest, were allocated in connection with spring sowing). The bulk of assistance was delivered in the form of grain seed that was 'lent' to collective farms (from reserves that had been seized in Ukraine) with the stipulation that it would be repaid with interest. State aid, it seems clear, was aimed at trying to salvage the collective farm system and a workforce necessary to maintain it. At the very same time, Party officials announced a campaign to root out 'enemy elements of all kinds who sought to exploit the food problems for their own counter-revolutionary purposes, spreading rumours about the famine and various 'horrors'. Famine-relief, in this way, became yet another way to determine who lived and who died.")

Food rationing in Ukraine was determined by city categories (where one lived, with capitals and industrial centers being given preferential distribution), occupational categories (with industrial and railroad workers being prioritized over blue collar workers and intelligentsia), status in the family unit (with employed persons being entitled to higher rations than dependents and the elderly), and type of workplace in relation to industrialization (with those who worked in industrial endeavors near steel mills being preferred in distribution over those who worked in rural areas or in food). According to James Abbe, who visited Ukraine at that time, while the Soviet government insisted on him as well as other foreigners to sign an affidavit stating that "they had seen no forced labor in the Ukraine", "only the actual industrial workers had received enough to eat and even their families had suffered". Describing the coal mines he visited in Donetsk region, James Abbe mentions: "The next day we went into the question of forced labor. Of course, the armed soldiers situated in the mine shafts, power houses and tipples had bayonets fastened to their rifles and revolvers strapped to their belts; but they were doubtless guarding the property — though the superintendent failed to tell us what they were guarding the mines against. Anyhow, the system of issuing and revoking food cards is far more sinister and effective than bayonets".

There was also migration in to Ukraine as a response to the famine: in response to the demographic collapse, the Soviet authorities ordered large-scale resettlements, with over 117,000 peasants from remote regions of the Soviet Union taking over the deserted farms. Areas depopulated by the famine were resettled by Russians in the Zaporizhzhia, Donetsk and Luhansk oblasts, but not as much so in central Ukraine. In some areas where depopulation was due to migration rather than mortality, Ukrainians returned to their places of residence to find their homes occupied by Russians, leading to widespread fights between Ukrainian farmers and Russian settlers. Such clashes caused around one million Russian settlers to be returned home.

=== Torgsin system ===
Torgsin networks appeared in 1931.They were selling goods for foreign currency or exchanging them for precious metals. Originally only exclusively for foreigners, but later soviet citizens were also allowed to exchange the goods. During Holodomor people brought family heritage - crosses, earrings, wedding rings to Torgsins and exchanged it for special stamps, for which they could obtain basic goods - mostly flour, cereals or sugar. Torgsins operated at highly speculative prices and were known for long queues. With that mechanism authorities were able to extort from the population whatever could have been hidden during the confiscations. Many families survived, in particular thanks to Torgsin. Yet the network was also a cause of a psychological trauma, since people had to give up on family valuables and relics that had not only material, but also spiritual value. During the Holodomor, the network of torgsins expanded considerably—by the end of 1933, there were already about 300 such shops in Soviet Ukraine. In 1933, the population brought 45 tons of pure gold to torgsins. The network existed until 1936.

=== Cannibalism ===
Evidence of widespread cannibalism was documented during the Holodomor:

Survival was a moral as well as a physical struggle. A woman doctor wrote to a friend in June 1933 that she had not yet become a cannibal, but was "not sure that I shall not be one by the time my letter reaches you." The good people died first. Those who refused to steal or to prostitute themselves died. Those who gave food to others died. Those who refused to eat corpses died. Those who refused to kill their fellow man died. Parents who resisted cannibalism died before their children did.... At least 2,505 people were sentenced for cannibalism in the years 1932 and 1933 in Ukraine, though the actual number of cases was certainly much higher.

Most cases of cannibalism were "necrophagy, the consumption of corpses of people who had died of starvation". But the murder of children for food was common as well. Many survivors told of neighbors who had killed and eaten their own children. One woman, asked why she had done this, "answered that her children would not survive anyway, but this way she would". She was arrested by the police. The police also documented cases of children being kidnapped, killed, and eaten, and "stories of children being hunted down as food" circulated in many areas. When nearly all grain and all kinds of animal meat had been exhausted, "a black market arose in human flesh" and it "may even have entered the official economy." The police kept a close eye on butcher shops and slaughterhouses, trying to prevent them from bringing human flesh into circulation. The Italian consul, Sergio Gradenigo, nevertheless reported from Kharkiv that the "trade of human meat becomes more active."

In March 1933, the secret police in Kyiv province collected "ten or more reports of cannibalism every day" but concluded that "in reality there are many more such incidents", most of which went unreported. Those found guilty of cannibalism were often "imprisoned, executed, or lynched". But while the authorities were well informed about the extent of cannibalism, they also tried to suppress this information from becoming widely known, the chief of the secret police warning "that written notes on the subject do not circulate among the officials where they might cause rumours". And the information secretly collected failed to spur the Soviet government into action. Various reports of the horrors of the famine, including the cannibalism, were sent to Moscow, where they were apparently shelved and ignored.

=== Ukrainians in other republics ===
Ukrainians in other parts of the Soviet Union also experienced famine and repressive policies. Rural districts with Ukrainian populations in parts of the Soviet Union outside of Ukraine had higher mortality rates in Russia and Belarus than other districts, this discrepancy did not however apply to urban Ukrainians in these areas. This is sometimes viewed as being connected to the Holodomor in Ukraine.

==== Kuban and the North Caucasus of Russia ====
In 1932–1933, the policies of forced collectivization of the Ukrainian population of the Soviet Union, which caused a devastating famine that greatly affected the Ukrainian population of the Kuban. The number of documented victims of famine in Kuban was at least 62,000. According to other historians, the real death toll is many times higher. Brain Boeck thinks the figure more in the "hundreds of thousands". One source estimate that during the Soviet famine of 1932–1933 Krasnodar lost over 14% of its population. Purges were also extensive in the region. 358 of 716 party secretaries in Kuban were removed, along with 43% of the 25,000 party members there; in total, 40% of the 115,000 to 120,000 rural party members in the North Caucasus were removed. Party officials associated with Ukrainization were targeted, as the national policy was viewed to be connected with the failure of grain procurement by Soviet authorities. (Note: Davies, Wheatcroft 2004, (page 109). "In a considerable number of districts in Ukraine and the North Caucasus counter-revolutionary elements – kulaks, former officers, Petlyurians, supporters of the Kuban' Rada and others – were able to penetrate into the kolkhozy as chairmen or influential members of the board, or as bookkeepers and storekeepers, and as brigade leaders at the threshers, and were able to penetrate into the village soviets, land agencies and cooperatives. They attempt to direct the work of these organisations against the interests of the proletarian state and the policy of the party; they try to organise a counter-revolutionary movement, the sabotage of the grain collections, and the sabotage of the village.") In this vein the Kuban corresponding to the famine had a reversal of the previously attempted policy of Ukrainisation. Prior to the reversal of Ukrainianization, the policy was failing in the Kuban with most local districts not completing it partially due to opposition by local Cossack nationalists and Russian chauvinists in the Kuban including by sabotage despite punitive threats from the state to complete the process made in May 1932.

The large Cossack stanitsa Poltavskaia sabotaged and resisted collectivization more than any other area in the Kuban which was perceived by Lazar Kaganovich to be connected to Ukrainian nationalist and Cossack conspiracy. Kaganovich relentlessly pursued the policy of requisition of grain in Poltavskaia and the rest of the Kuban and personally oversaw the purging of local leaders and Cossacks. Kaganovich viewed the resistance of Poltavskaia through Ukrainian lens delivering oration in a mixed Ukrainian language. To justify this Kaganovich cited a letter allegedly written by a stanitsa ataman named Grigorii Omel'chenko advocating Cossack separatism and local reports of resistance to collectivization in association with this figure to substantiate this suspicion of the area. However Kaganocvich did not reveal in speeches throughout the region that many of those targeted by persecution in Poltavskaia had their family members and friends deported or shot including in years before the supposed Omel'chenko crisis even started. Ultimately due to being perceived as the most rebellious area almost all (or 12,000) members of the Poltavskaia stantisa were deported to the north. This coincided with and was a part of a wider deportation of 46,000 cossacks from Kuban. According to the Holodomor Museum, 300,000 people were deported from the North Caucasus between 1930 and 1933, two thirds of them from the Kuban region.

Likely in connection to the affairs in Poltavskaia, Ukrainization was officially reversed in a decree on 26 December 1932; as stated in this decree, there was a two-week deadline to transfer all publishing and paperwork in the region to Russian, and the Ukrainian language was effectively banned in Kuban until 1991. A representative of the Ukrainian state publishing house claimed 1,500 Ukrainian teachers in the Kuban were either deported or killed though this number has not been verified. The professional Ukrainian theatre in Krasnodar was closed. All Ukrainian toponyms in the Kuban, which reflected the areas from which the first Ukrainians settlers had moved, were changed. The names of Stanytsias such as the rural town of Kyiv, in Krasnodar, was changed to "Krasnoartilyevskaya", and Uman to "Leningrad", and Poltavskaia to "Krasnoarmieiskaya". Russification, the Holodomor of 1932–1933 and other tactics used by the Union government led to a catastrophic fall in the population that self-identified as being Ukrainian in the Kuban. Official Soviet Union statistics of 1959 state that Ukrainians made up 4% of the population, in 1989 – 3%. The self-identified Ukrainian population of Kuban decreased from 915,000 in 1926, to 150,000 in 1939.

==== Kazakhstan ====
Ethnic minorities in Kazakhstan were significantly affected by the Kazakh famine of 1930–1933 in addition to the Kazakhs. Ukrainians in Kazakhstan had the second highest proportional death rate after the Kazakhs themselves. Between the 1926 and 1937 censuses, Ukrainian population in Kazakhstan decreased by 36% from 859,396 to 549,859 – mainly from famine and epidemics but also including emigration – while Uzbeks, Uighurs, and other ethnic minorities in Kazakhstan each lost between 12% and 30% of their populations.

=== Aftermath and immediate reception ===
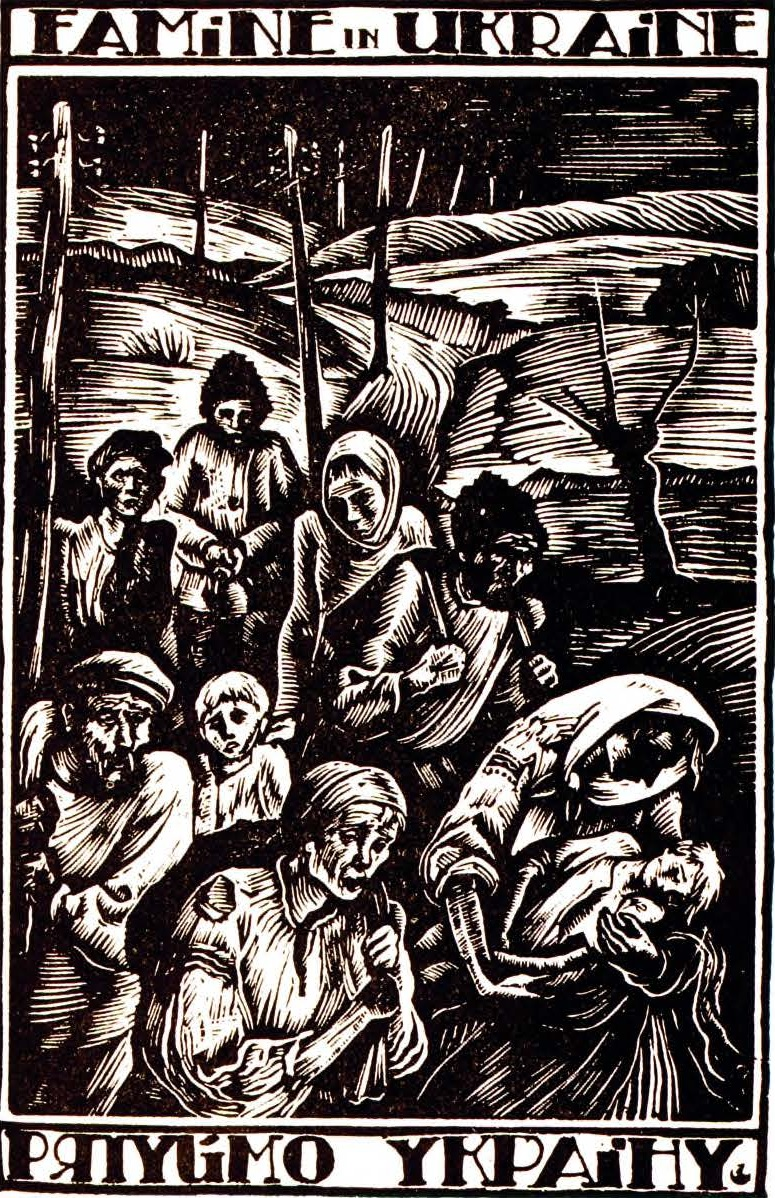
A print from a postcard designed by Zofia Nalepińska-Bojczuk, referring to the Holodomor, 1935

Despite attempts by the Soviet authorities to hide the scale of the disaster, it became known abroad thanks to the publications of journalists Gareth Jones, Malcolm Muggeridge, Ewald Ammende, and Rhea Clyman, and photographs made by engineer Alexander Wienerberger and others. To support their denial of the famine, the Soviets hosted prominent Westerners such as George Bernard Shaw, French ex-prime minister Édouard Herriot, and others at Potemkin villages, who then made statements that they had not seen hunger.

During the German occupation of Ukraine, the occupation authorities allowed the publication of articles in local newspapers about Holodomor and other communist crimes, but they also did not want to pay too much attention to this issue in order to avoid stirring national sentiment. In 1942, Stepan Sosnovy, an agronomist in Kharkiv, published a comprehensive statistical research on the number of Holodomor casualties, based on documents from Soviet archives.

In the post-war period, the Ukrainian diaspora disseminated information about the Holodomor in Europe and North America. At first, the public attitude was rather cautious, as the information came from people who had lived in the occupied territories, but it gradually changed in the 1950s. Scientific study of the Holodomor, based on the growing number of memoirs published by survivors, began in the 1950s.

=== Death toll ===
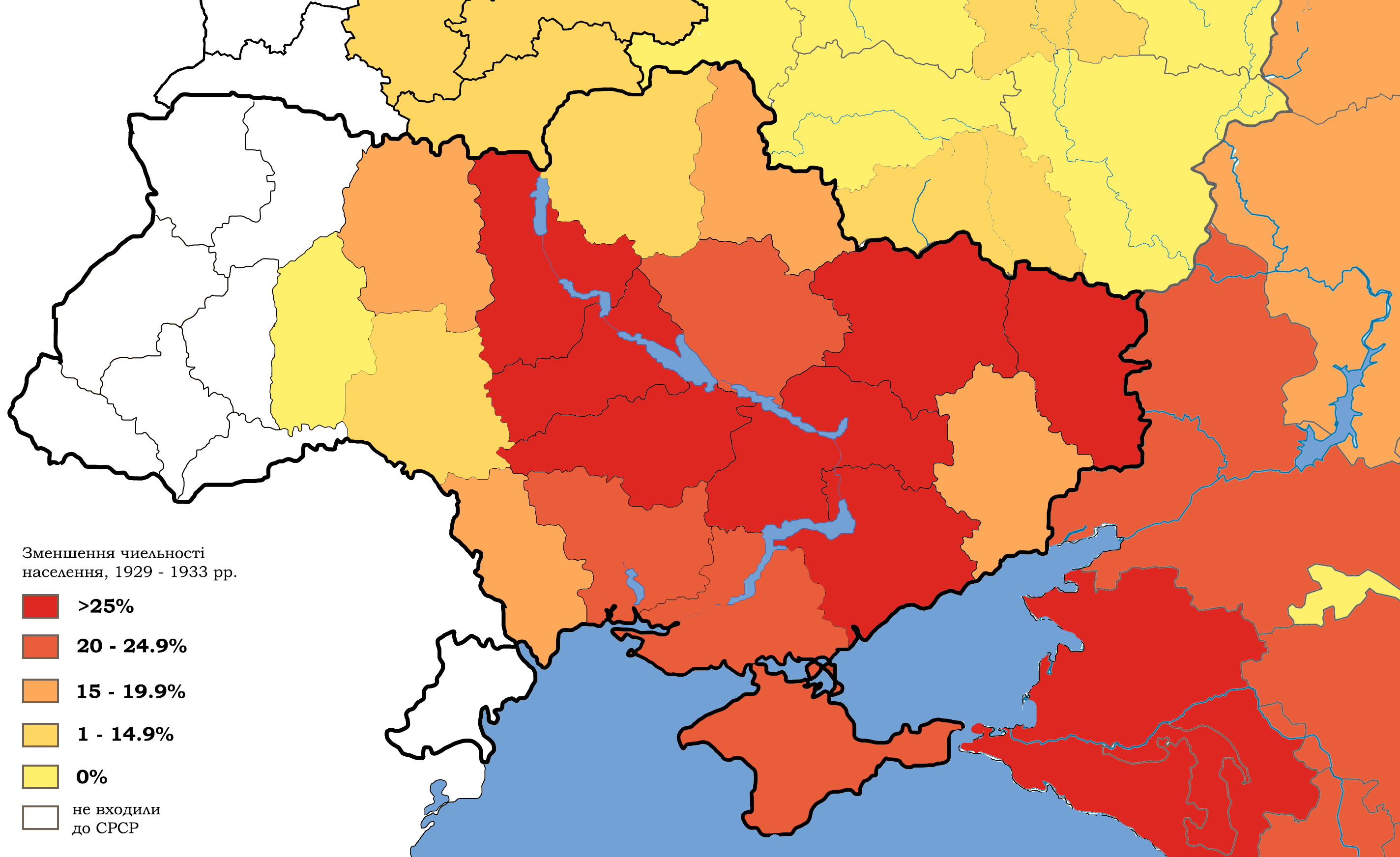
A map of the depopulation of Ukraine and southern Russia from 1929 to 1933, with territories that were not part of the Soviet state during the famine in white

The Soviet Union long denied that the famine had taken place. The NKVD (and later KGB) controlled the archives for the Holodomor period and made relevant records available very slowly. The exact number of the victims remains unknown and is probably impossible to estimate even within a margin of error of a hundred thousand. However, by the end of 1933, millions of people had starved to death or otherwise died unnaturally in the Soviet republics. In 2001, based on a range of official demographic data, historian Stephen G. Wheatcroft noted that official death statistics for this period were systematically repressed and showed that many deaths were un-registered.

Estimates vary in their coverage, with some using the 1933 Ukraine borders, some of the current borders, and some counting ethnic Ukrainians. Some extrapolate on the basis of deaths in a given area, while others use archival data. Some historians question the accuracy of Soviet censuses, as they may reflect Soviet propaganda.

Other estimates come from recorded discussions between world leaders. In an August 1942 conversation, Stalin gave Winston Churchill his estimates of the number of "kulaks" who were repressed for resisting collectivisation as 10 million, in all of the Soviet Union, rather than only in Ukraine. When using this number, Stalin implied that it included not only those who lost their lives but also those who were forcibly deported.

There are variations in opinion as to whether deaths in Gulag labour camps should be counted or only those who starved to death at home. Estimates before archival opening varied widely such as: 2.5 million (Volodymyr Kubiyovych); 4.8 million (Vasyl Hryshko); and 5 million (Robert Conquest).

In the 1980s, dissident demographer and historian Alexander P. Babyonyshev (writing as Sergei Maksudov) estimated officially non-accounted child mortality in 1933 at 150,000, leading to a calculation that the number of births for 1933 should be increased from 471,000 to 621,000 (down from 1,184,000 in 1927). Given the decreasing birth rates and assuming the natural mortality rates in 1933 to be equal to the average annual mortality rate in 1927–1930 (524,000 per year), a natural population growth for 1933 would have been 97,000 (as opposed to the recorded decrease of 1,379,000). This was five times less than the growth in the previous three years (1927–1930). Straight-line extrapolation of population (continuation of the previous net change) between census takings in 1927 and 1936 would have been +4.043 million, which compares to a recorded −538,000 change. Overall change in birth and death amounts to 4.581 million fewer people but whether through factors of choice, disease or starvation will never be fully known.

In the 2000s, there were debates among historians and in civil society about the number of deaths as Soviet files were released and tension built between Russia and the Ukrainian president Viktor Yushchenko. Yushchenko and other Ukrainian politicians described fatalities as in the region of seven to ten million. Yushchenko stated in a speech to the United States Congress that the Holodomor "took away 20 million lives of Ukrainians,". Former Canadian Prime Minister Stephen Harper issued a public statement giving the death toll at about 10 million.

Some Ukrainian and Western historians use similar figures. David R. Marples gave a figure of 7.5 million in 2007. During an international conference held in Ukraine in 2016, Holodomor 1932–1933 loss of the Ukrainian nation, at the National University of Kyiv Taras Shevchenko, it was claimed that during the Holodomor 7 million Ukrainians were killed, and in total, 10 million people died of starvation across the USSR.

However, the use of the 7 to 20 million figures has been criticized by historians Timothy D. Snyder and Stephen G. Wheatcroft. Snyder wrote: "President Viktor Yushchenko does his country a grave disservice by claiming ten million deaths, thus exaggerating the number of Ukrainians killed by a factor of three; but it is true that the famine in Ukraine of 1932–1933 was a result of purposeful political decisions, and killed about three million people." In an email to Postmedia News, Wheatcroft wrote: "I find it regrettable that Stephen Harper and other leading Western politicians are continuing to use such exaggerated figures for Ukrainian famine mortality" and "[t]here is absolutely no basis for accepting a figure of 10 million Ukrainians dying as a result of the famine of 1932–1933." In 2001, Wheatcroft had calculated total population loss (including stillbirth) across the Union at 10 million and possibly up to 15 million between 1931 and 1934, including 2.8 million (and possibly up to 4.8 million excess deaths) and 3.7 million (up to 6.7 million) population losses including birth losses in Ukraine.

Declassified Soviet statistics (in thousands)
| Year | Births | Deaths | Natural change |
|---|---|---|---|
| 1927 | 1,184 | 523 | 661 |
| 1928 | 1,139 | 496 | 643 |
| 1929 | 1,081 | 539 | 542 |
| 1930 | 1,023 | 536 | 487 |
| 1931 | 975 | 515 | 460 |
| 1932 | 782 | 668 | 114 |
| 1933 | 471 | 1,850 | −1,379 |
| 1934 | 571 | 483 | 88 |
| 1935 | 759 | 342 | 417 |
| 1936 | 895 | 361 | 534 |

In 2002, Ukrainian historian Stanislav Kulchytsky, using demographic data including those recently unclassified, narrowed the losses to about 3.2 million or, allowing for the lack of precise data, 3 million to 3.5 million. The number of recorded excess deaths extracted from the birth/death statistics from Soviet archives is contradictory. The data fail to add up to the differences between the results of the 1926 Census and the 1937 Census. Kulchytsky summarized the declassified Soviet statistics as showing a decrease of 538,000 people in the population of Soviet Ukraine between 1926 census (28,926,000) and 1937 census (28,388,000).

Historians estimate a quarter of the death toll was from children and extrapolate a further 600,000 lost births. (Note: Lost births are additional births that would hypothetically have taken place had there been no famine.)

Similarly, Wheatcroft's work from Soviet archives showed that excess deaths in Ukraine in 1932–1933 numbered a minimum of 1.8 million (2.7 including birth losses): "Depending upon the estimations made concerning unregistered mortality and natality, these figures could be increased to a level of 2.8 million to a maximum of 4.8 million excess deaths and to 3.7 million to a maximum of 6.7 million population losses (including birth losses)".

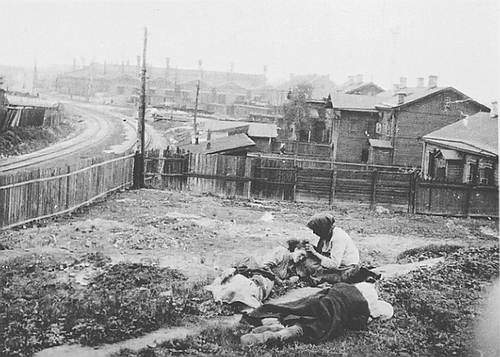
Starvation during the Holodomor, Kharkivshchyna, 1933. Photo by Alexander Wienerberger

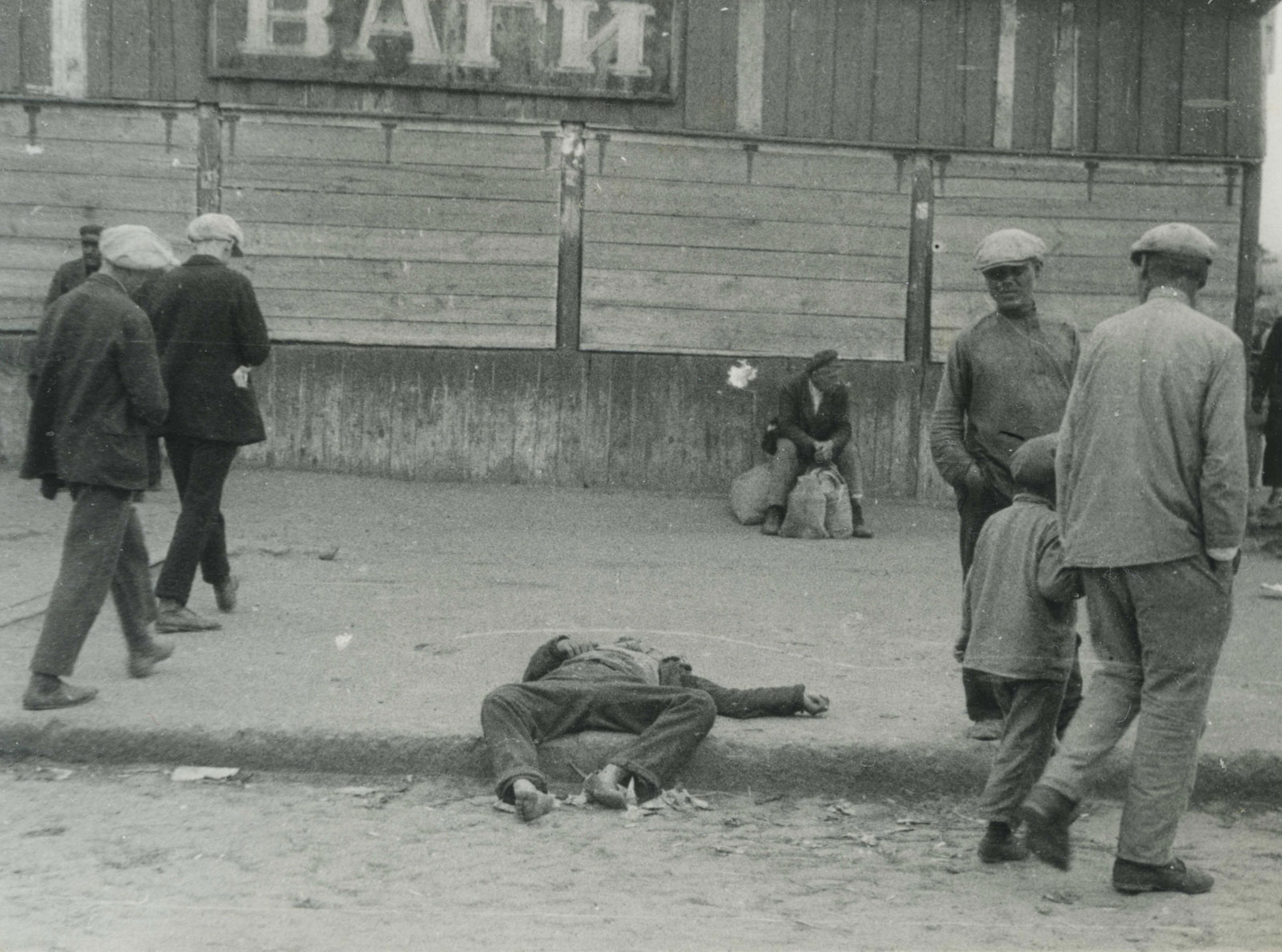
Passers-by and the corpse of a starved man on a street in Kharkiv, 1932

A 2002 study by French demographer Jacques Vallin and colleagues utilising some similar primary sources to Kulchytsky, and performing an analysis with more sophisticated demographic tools with forward projection of expected growth from the 1926 census and backward projection from the 1939 census estimates the number of direct deaths for 1933 as 2.582 million. This number of deaths does not reflect the total demographic loss for Ukraine from these events as the fall of the birth rate during the crisis and the out-migration contribute to the latter as well. The total population shortfall from the expected value between 1926 and 1939 estimated by Vallin amounted to 4.566 million.

Of this number, 1.057 million is attributed to the birth deficit, 930,000 to forced out-migration, and 2.582 million to the combination of excess mortality and voluntary out-migration. With the latter assumed to be negligible, this estimate gives the number of deaths as the result of the 1933 famine about 2.2 million. According to demographic studies, life expectancy, which had been in the high forties to low fifties, fell sharply for those born in 1932 to 28 years, and for 1933 fell further to the extremely low 10.8 years for females and 7.3 years for males. It remained abnormally low for 1934 but, as commonly expected for the post-crisis period peaked in 1935–36.

According to Snyder in 2010, the recorded figure of excess deaths was 2.4 million. However, Snyder claims that this figure is "substantially low" due to many deaths going unrecorded. Snyder states that demographic calculations carried out by the Ukrainian government provide a figure of 3.89 million dead, and opined that the actual figure is likely between these two figures, approximately 3.3 million deaths to starvation and disease related to the starvation in Ukraine from 1932 to 1933. Snyder also estimates that of the million people who died in the Russian Soviet Federative Socialist Republic from famine at the same time, approximately 200,000 were ethnic Ukrainians due to Ukrainian-inhabited regions being particularly hard hit in Russia.

Russian historian Aleksandr Shubin and Kulchytsky believe that figures recorded by Soviet censuses are reliable, and that the figure of unrecorded deaths is not substantial. Shubin writes that for 10 years only around 300 000 deaths could go unrecorded in the whole Soviet Union, and estimates the number of direct deaths as between 1 and 2 millions.

As a child, Mikhail Gorbachev, born into a mixed Russian-Ukrainian family, experienced the famine in Stavropol Krai, Russia. He recalled in a memoir that "In that terrible year [in 1933] nearly half the population of my native village, Privolnoye, starved to death, including two sisters and one brother of my father."

Wheatcroft and R. W. Davies concluded that disease was the cause of a large number of deaths: in 1932–1933, there were 1.2 million cases of typhus and 500,000 cases of typhoid fever. Malnourishment increases fatality rates from many diseases, and are not counted by some historians. From 1932 to 1934, the largest rate of increase was recorded for typhus, commonly spread by lice. In conditions of harvest failure and increased poverty, lice are likely to increase.

Gathering numerous refugees at railway stations, on trains and elsewhere facilitates the spread. In 1933, the number of recorded cases was 20 times the 1929 level. The number of cases per head of population recorded in Ukraine in 1933 was already considerably higher than in the USSR as a whole. By June 1933, the incidence in Ukraine had increased to nearly 10 times the January level, and it was much higher than in the rest of the USSR.

Estimates of the human losses due to famine must account for the numbers involved in migration (including forced resettlement). According to Soviet statistics, the migration balance for the population in Ukraine for 1927–1936 period was a loss of 1.343 million people. Even when the data were collected, the Soviet statistical institutions acknowledged that the precision was less than for the data of the natural population change. The total number of deaths in Ukraine due to unnatural causes for the given ten years was 3.238 million. Accounting for the lack of precision, estimates of the human toll range from 2.2 million to 3.5 million deaths.

According to Babyonyshev's 1981 estimate, about 81.3% of the famine victims in the Ukrainian SSR were ethnic Ukrainians, 4.5% Russians, 1.4% Jews and 1.1% were Poles. Many Belarusians, Volga Germans and other nationalities were victims as well. The Ukrainian rural population was the hardest hit by the Holodomor. Since the peasantry constituted a demographic backbone of the Ukrainian nation, the tragedy deeply affected the Ukrainians for many years. In an October 2013 opinion poll (in Ukraine) 38.7% of those polled stated "my families had people affected by the famine", 39.2% stated they did not have such relatives, and 22.1% did not know.

== Genocide question ==
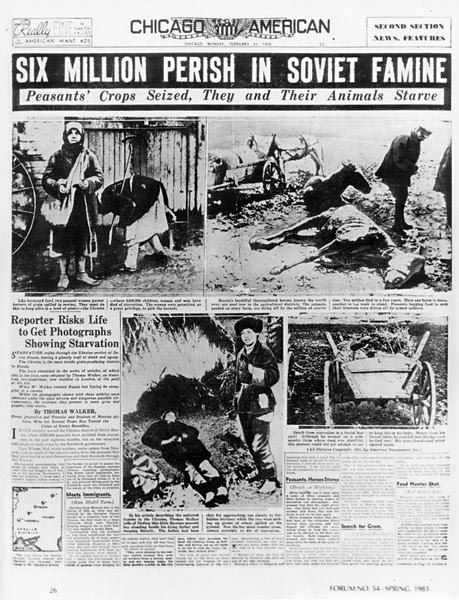
Chicago American's front page

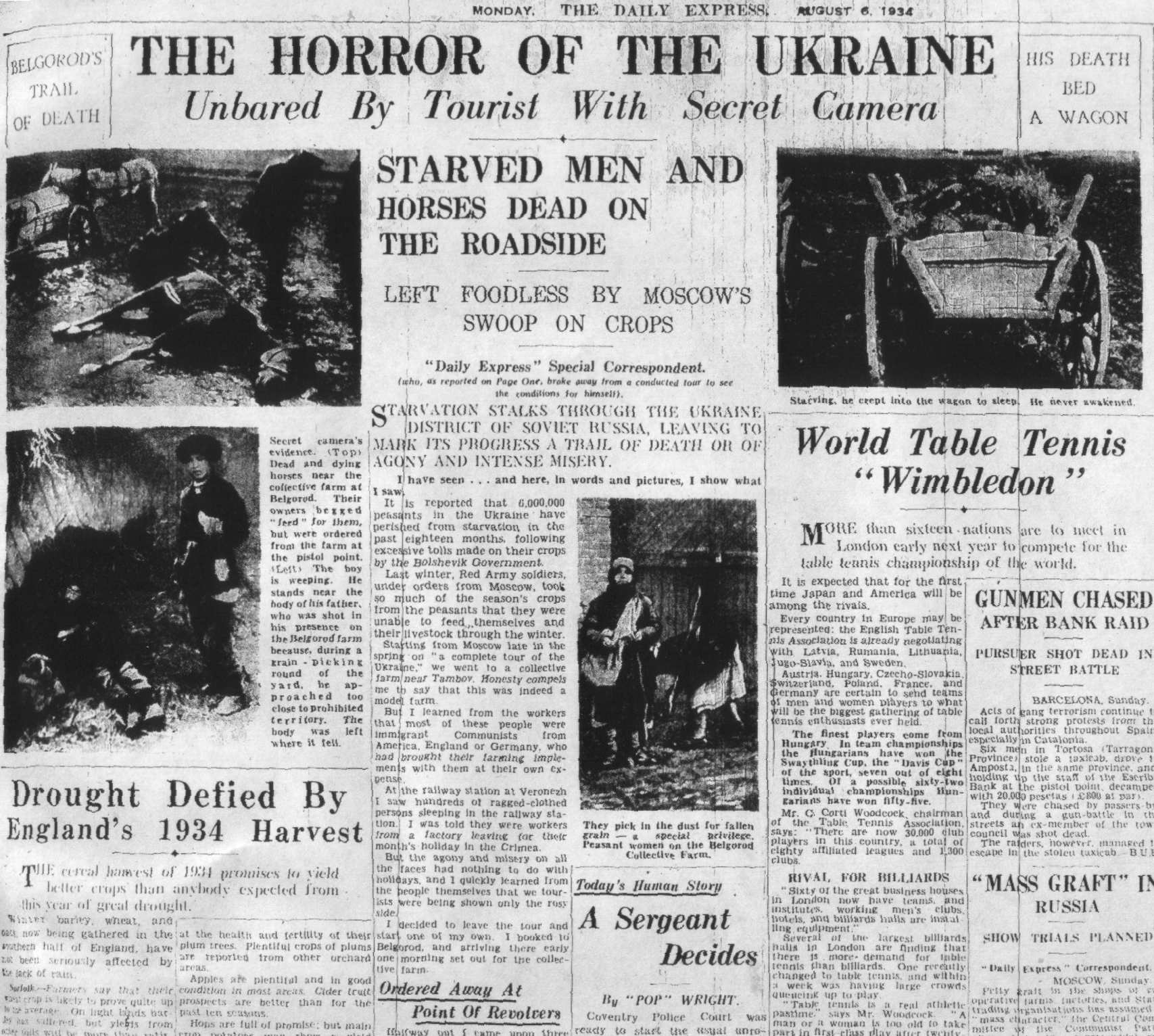
Daily Express, 6 August 1934

Scholars continue to debate whether the human-made Soviet famine was a central act in a campaign of genocide, or a tragic byproduct of rapid Soviet industrialization and the collectivization of agriculture. Whether the Holodomor is a genocide is a significant and contentious issue in modern politics. A number of governments, such as Canada, have recognized the Holodomor as an act of genocide. The decision was criticized by David R. Marples, who claimed that states who recognize the Holodomor as a genocide are motivated by emotion, or on pressure by local and international groups rather than hard evidence. In contrast, some sources argue that Russian influence and unwillingness to worsen relations with Russia would prevent or stall the recognition of Holodomor as a genocide in certain regions (for example, Germany).

Scholarly positions are diverse. Raphael Lemkin (a pioneer of genocide studies who coined the term genocide, and an initiator of the Genocide Convention), called the famine an intentional genocide. James Mace and Norman Naimark have written that the Holodomor was a genocide and the intentional result of Soviet policies under Stalin. According to Lemkin, Ukraine was "perhaps the classic example of Soviet genocide, its longest and broadest experiment in Russification – the destruction of the Ukrainian nation". Lemkin stated that, because Ukrainians were very sensitive to the racial murder of its people and way too populous, the Soviet regime could not follow a pattern of total extermination (as in the Holocaust). Instead the genocidal effort consisted of four steps: 1) extermination of the Ukrainian national elite, 2) liquidation of the Ukrainian Autocephalous Orthodox Church, 3) extermination of a significant part of the Ukrainian peasantry as "custodians of traditions, folklore and music, national language and literature", and 4) populating the territory with other nationalities with intent of mixing Ukrainians with them, which would eventually lead to the dissolution of the Ukrainian nation. Because of these four factors, Lemkin considered the Holodomor an attempt to destroy the whole Ukrainian nation, not just the Ukrainian peasantry. The "rediscovery" of his 1953 address about the Holodomor has influenced Holodomor scholars, especially his view of genocide as a complex process targeting institutions, culture, and economic existence of a group and not necessarily meaning its "immediate destruction".

Stanislav Kulchytsky, who recognizes Holodomor as genocide, believes that historians should approach the study of the famine with realization that in the Soviet socialist construction "appearance belied reality", and that the real intentions of some ideas and policies would not be put on paper. He nevertheless believes that there is enough evidence that proves that Stalin felt hostility and distrust towards Ukrainians and wanted to suppress any potential disobedience from their side. Kulchytsky bases his claims among other things on Stalin's telegrams and letters sent to the highest-ranked officials shortly before and during the time when most lethal policies were applied and executed in Ukraine and Kuban. He believes that while the famine started rather as a result of collectivization, near the end of 1932 it was turned into an instrument of intentional starvation of millions of Ukrainians to death.

Timothy Snyder states that, in his opinion, Holodomor meets the criteria of the Genocide convention. He does, however, refrain from using the term and prefers the term "mass killing" instead, arguing that the public misinterprets the term genocide as an intention to murder every member of the national or ethnic group, something that the Armenian genocide and Holocaust are closer to than any other cases, including the Holodomor.

Other historians such as Michael Ellman consider the Holodomor a crime against humanity, but do not classify it as a genocide. Economist Steven Rosefielde and historian Robert Conquest consider the death toll to be primarily due to state policy, and poor harvests. Following the dissolution of the Soviet Union, Conquest was granted access to the Soviet state archives alongside other western academics. In 2004, Wheatcroft published a private correspondence that he had with Conquest. In the exchange, Conquest wrote that he is now of the opinion that the Holodomor was not purposefully inflicted by Stalin but "what I argue is that with resulting famine imminent, he could have prevented it, but put 'Soviet interest' other than feeding the starving first – thus consciously abetting it". In an interview recorded in 2006 Conquest stated the Holodomor should be recognized as an attack on the Ukrainian people and discussed problems with the use of the term genocide.

Robert Davies, Stephen Kotkin, Stephen Wheatcroft and J. Arch Getty reject the notion that Stalin intentionally wanted to kill Ukrainians, but conclude that Stalinist policies and widespread incompetence among government officials set the stage for famine in Ukraine and other Soviet republics. Anne Applebaum believes that the famine was planned to undermine Ukrainian identity but discusses how shifts in understanding of the term genocide mean that it is more difficult to apply now that it was when the term was initially conceived. Another argument she puts forward is that the question of genocide is not as important as it once was because it was a proxy debate about Ukraine and Ukrainians' right to exist, a right which no longer needs historic justification.

== Soviet and Western denial and downplay ==
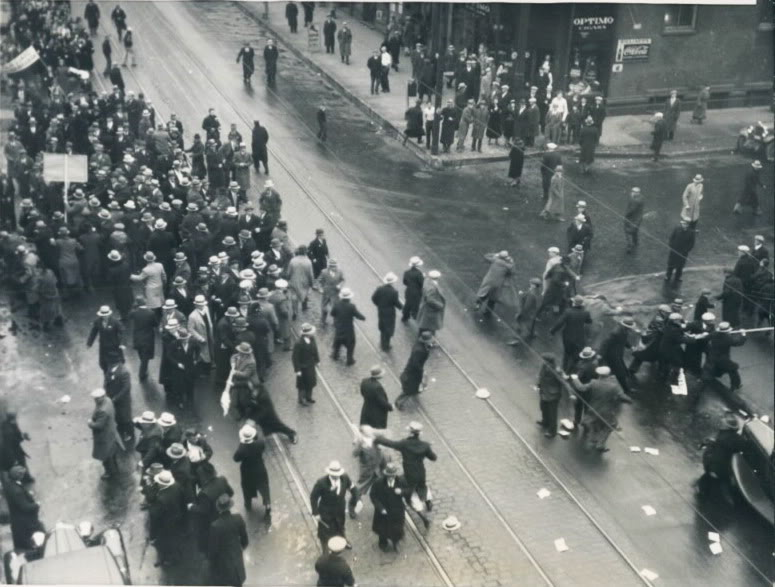
American communists attacking a parade of Ukrainians marching against the Holodomor in Chicago, 1933

Scholars consider Holodomor denial to be the assertion that the 1932–1933 famine in Soviet Ukraine did not occur. Denying the existence of the famine was the Soviet state's position and reflected in both Soviet propaganda and the work of some Western journalists and intellectuals including George Bernard Shaw, Walter Duranty, and Louis Fischer. In Britain and the United States, eye-witness accounts by Welsh freelance journalist Gareth Jones and by the American Communist Fred Beal were met with widespread disbelief.

In the Soviet Union, any discussion of the famine was banned entirely. Ukrainian historian Stanislav Kulchytsky stated the Soviet government ordered him to falsify his findings and depict the famine as an unavoidable natural disaster, to absolve the Communist Party and uphold the legacy of Stalin.

== In modern politics ==
The event is considered a genocide by Ukraine and the European Parliament, and the lower house of parliament of Russia condemned the Soviet regime "that has neglected the lives of people for the achievement of economic and political goals".

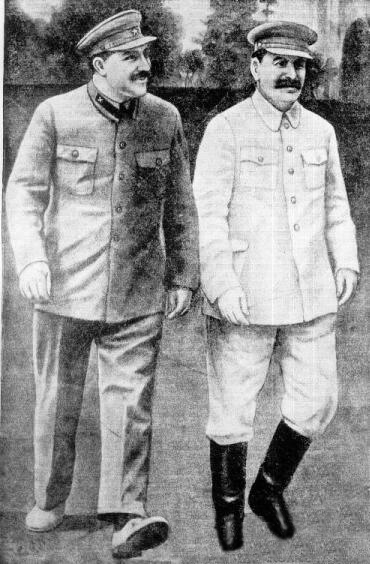
Lazar Kaganovich (left) played a role in enforcing Stalin's policies that led to the Holodomor.

On 10 November 2003 at the United Nations, 25 countries, including Russia, Ukraine, and United States signed a joint statement on the seventieth anniversary of the Holodomor with the following preamble:

In the former Soviet Union millions of men, women and children fell victims to the cruel actions and policies of the totalitarian regime. The Great Famine of 1932–1933 in Ukraine (Holodomor), took from 7 million to 10 million innocent lives and became a national tragedy for the Ukrainian people. In this regard, we note activities in observance of the seventieth anniversary of this Famine, in particular organized by the Government of Ukraine. Honouring the seventieth anniversary of the Ukrainian tragedy, we also commemorate the memory of millions of Russians, Kazakhs and representatives of other nationalities who died of starvation in the Volga River region, Northern Caucasus, Kazakhstan and in other parts of the former Soviet Union, as a result of civil war and forced collectivisation, leaving deep scars in the consciousness of future generations.

In 1984, the United States Congress established the U.S. Commission on the Ukraine Famine, which compiled its 1988 Report to Congress. In the report, the US government concludes with anecdotal evidence, that the Soviets had purposely prevented Ukrainians from leaving famine-struck regions. This was corroborated following the discovery of Stalin's letter to Molotov titled, "Preventing the Mass Exodus of Peasants who are Starving", restricting travel by peasants after "in the Kuban and Ukraine a massive outflow of peasants 'for bread' has begun", that "like the outflow from Ukraine last year, was organized by the enemies of Soviet power." The commission published the earlier-mentioned letter written by Stalin to Lazar Kaganovich on 11 September 1932.

The Ukrainian parliament first recognized the Holodomor as a genocide in 2003, and criminalized both Holodomor denial and Holocaust denial in 2006. In 2010, the Kyiv Court of Appeal ruled that the Holodomor was an act of genocide and held Joseph Stalin, Vyacheslav Molotov, Lazar Kaganovich, Stanislav Kosior, Pavel Postyshev, Mendel Khatayevich, Vlas Chubar and other Bolshevik leaders responsible.

The Holodomor has been compared to the Irish Famine of 1845–1849 that took place in Ireland under British rule, which has been the subject of similar controversy and debate.

Russia's war strategy in the war against Ukraine in 2022 has drawn parallels with the Holodomor for the intentional impediment of relief supplies to civilians, the blockade of Ukrainian ports that threatened to cause famine in other countries, and the deliberate targeting of civilian infrastructure to deprive Ukrainians of the necessities of life. As of early May 2022, Ukraine's Defense Ministry claims that Russian forces have plundered at least 500,000 tons of grain from farmers since the invasion started. This looting included the seizure of industrial farm equipment, such as tractors, and forcing farmers to surrender 70% of their grain yields. Russia's use of starvation as a weapon of war in 2022 has been cited as part of a genocidal pattern in a major report by 35 legal and genocide experts.

=== Government recognition as a genocide ===
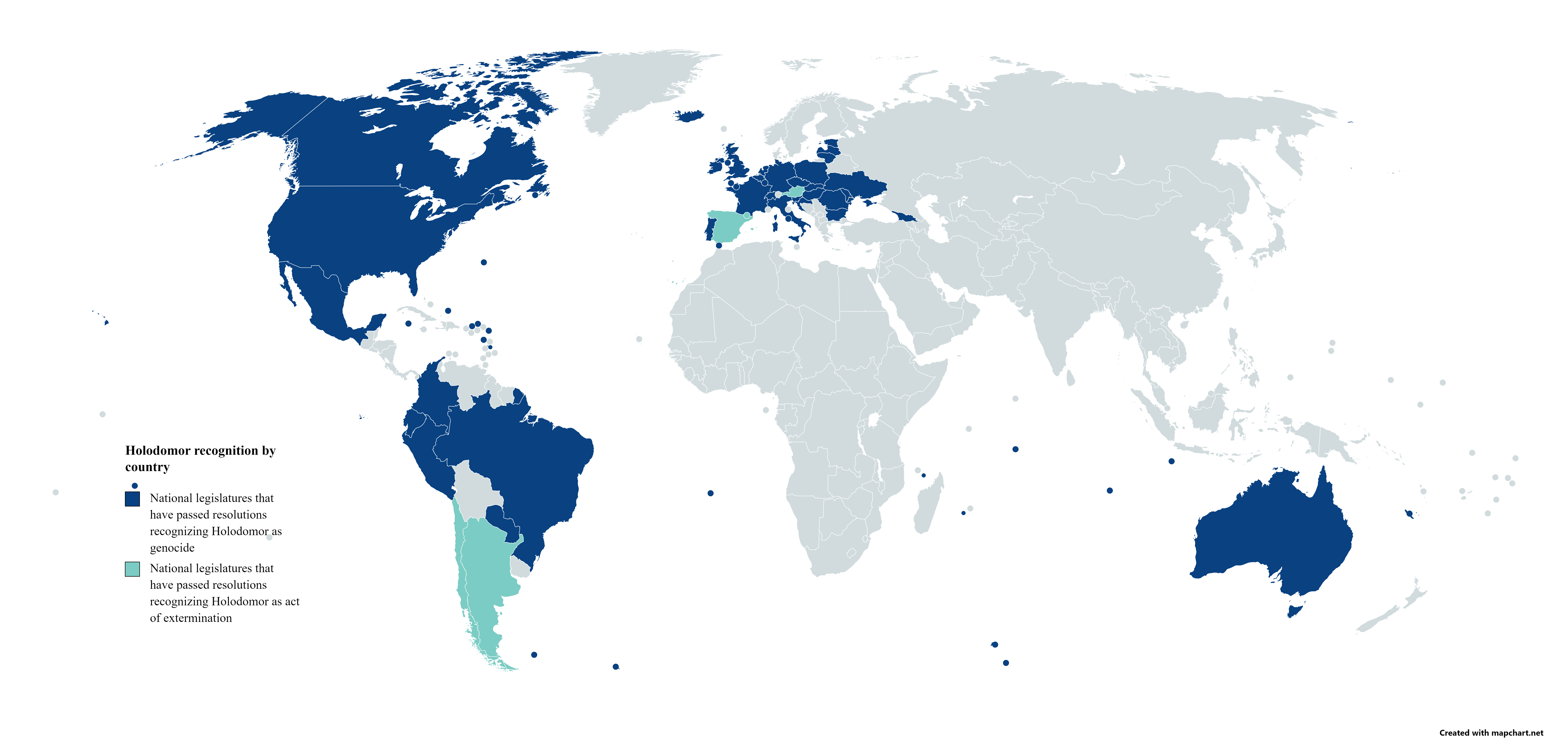
Recognition of the Holodomor by country

Ukraine's Ministry of Foreign Affairs has run campaigns and lobbied the United Nations and the Council of Europe to recognise the Holodomor as a genocide internationally. The governments of various countries have issued statements recognizing the Holodomor as genocide including Ukraine since 2006, and 13 other countries as of 2015.

In November 2022, the Belarusian opposition in exile recognised the Holodomor as a genocide, and Pope Francis compared the Russian war in Ukraine with its targeted destruction of civilian infrastructure to the "terrible Holodomor Genocide", during an address at St. Peter's Square. As of January 2026, 34 countries recognise the Holodomor as a genocide.

Countries whose legislatures have passed a resolution recognizing the Holodomor as a genocide:

- Australia, 28 October 1993
- Belgium, 10 March 2023
- Bulgaria, 1 February 2023
- Canada, 20 June 2003
- Colombia, 21 December 2007
- Croatia, moved 15 June 2023, approved 28 June 2023
- Czech Republic, 6 April 2022
- Ecuador, 30 October 2007
- Estonia, 20 October 1993
- France, 28 March 2023
- Georgia, 20 December 2005
- Germany, 30 November 2022
- Hungary, 26 November 2003
- Iceland, 22 March 2023
- Italy, 26 July 2023
- Latvia, 13 March 2008
- Lithuania, 24 November 2005
- Luxembourg, 13 June 2023
- Mexico, 19 February 2008
- Moldova, 24 November 2022
- Netherlands, 7 July 2023
- Paraguay, 25 October 2007
- Peru, 19 June 2007
- Poland, 4 December 2006
- Portugal, 2 March 2017
- Romania, 24 November 2022
- Slovakia, 20 June 2023
- Slovenia, 23 May 2023
- Switzerland, 24 September 2024
- Ukraine, 28 November 2006
- United Kingdom, 25 May 2023 (resolution passed by the House of Commons)
  - Wales, 25 October 2023
- United States, 11 December 2018 (resolution passed by the House of Representatives; on 4 October 2018 resolution passed by the Senate)

Countries whose legislatures have partially passed a resolution recognizing the Holodomor as a genocide:

- Brazil, 26 April 2022 (resolution passed by the Federal Senate)
- Ireland, 24 November 2022 (resolution passed by the Seanad)

Countries whose parliamentary factions have issued joint declarations recognizing the Holodomor as a genocide:

- Finland, 24 November 2023 (joint declaration by all parliamentary faction leaders due to the lack of a procedural mechanism for historical resolutions)

Other political bodies whose legislatures have passed a resolution recognizing Holodomor as a genocide:

- European Union, 15 December 2022
- Council of Europe, 12 October 2023
- Chechen Republic of Ichkeria (government in exile), 26 November 2022

Other countries that have issued official documents describing the Holodomor as genocide:

- Vatican City, 2 April 2004

== Remembrance ==
To honour those who perished in the Holodomor, monuments have been dedicated and public events held annually in Ukraine and worldwide.

=== Ukraine ===
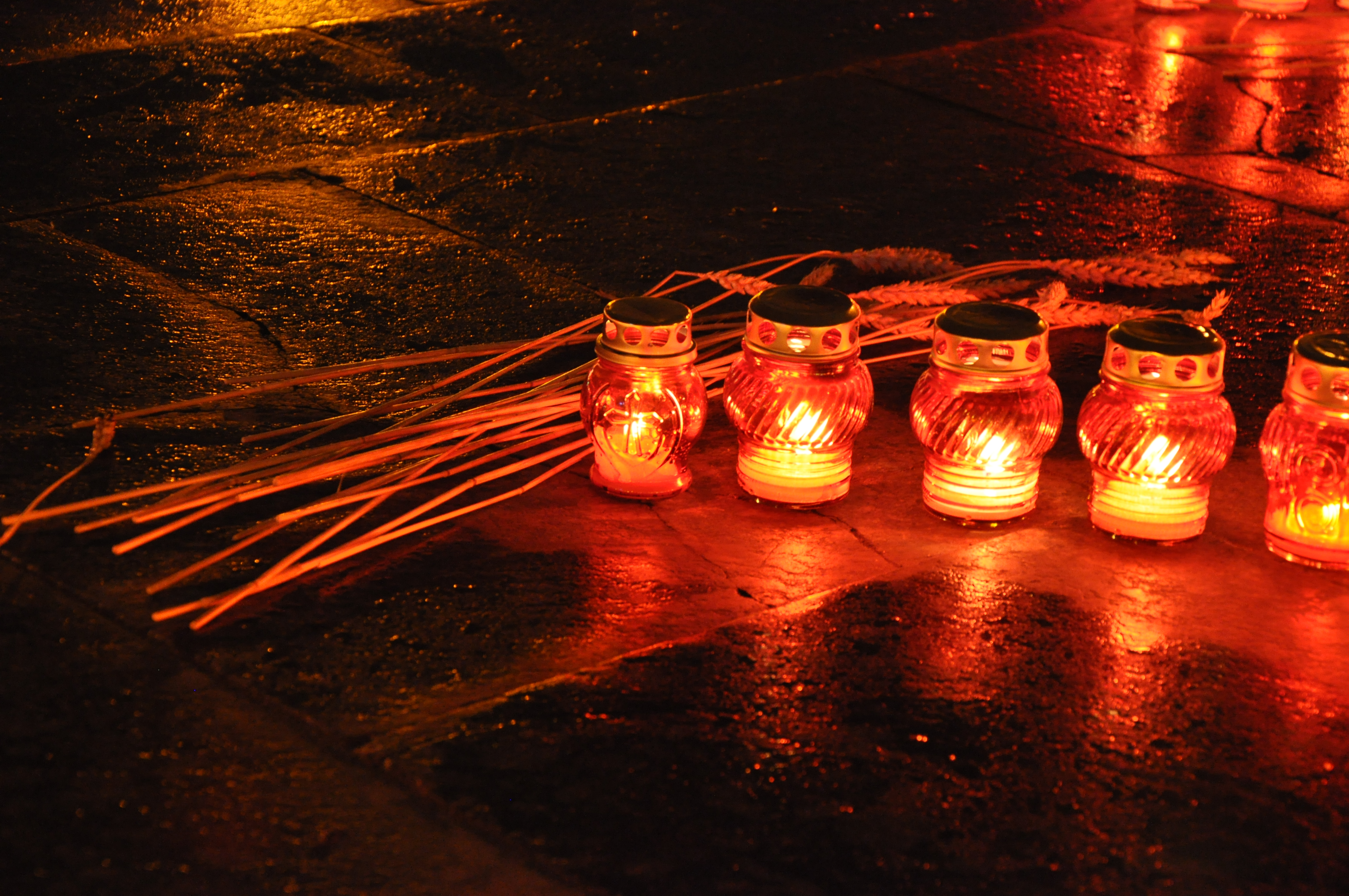
Candles and wheat as a symbol of remembrance during the Holodomor Remembrance Day 2013 in Lviv

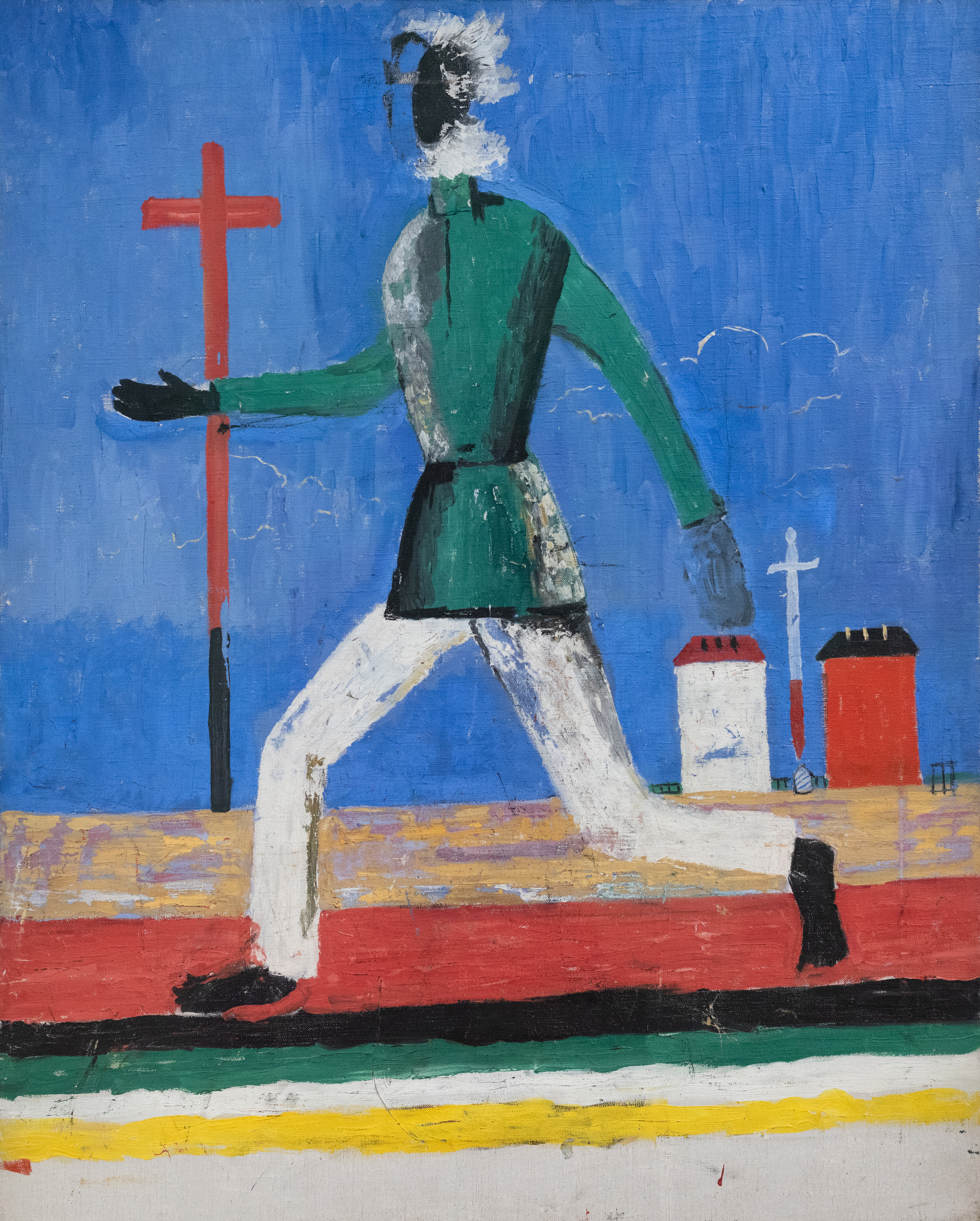
One of the interpretations of The Running Man painting by Kazimir Malevich, also known as Peasant Between a Cross and a Sword, is the artist's indictment of the Great Famine. "Kasimir Malevich's haunting 'The Running Man' (1933–34), showing a peasant fleeing across a deserted landscape, is eloquent testimony to the disaster."

Since 1998, Ukraine has officially observed the Holodomor Memorial Day on the fourth Saturday of November, established by a presidential decree of Leonid Kuchma. In 2006, customs were established for a minute of silence at 4 o'clock in the afternoon, flags flown at half-mast, and restrictions on entertainment broadcasting. In 2007, three days of commemorations on the Maidan Nezalezhnosti included video testimonies of communist crimes in Ukraine and documentaries, scholarly lectures, and the National Bank of Ukraine issued a set of commemorative coins.

As of 2009, Ukrainian schoolchildren take a more extensive course of the history of the Holodomor.

The National Museum of the Holodomor-Genocide was erected on the slopes of the Dnieper river, welcoming its first visitors on 22 November 2008. The ceremony of the memorial's opening was dedicated to the 75th anniversary of the Holodomor. The year 2008 was declared by president Viktor Yushchenko as the "Year of Remembrance" to commemorate victims of the famine.

In an October 2013 opinion poll, 33.7% of Ukrainians fully agreed and 30.4% rather agreed with the statement "The Holodomor was the result of actions committed by the Soviet authorities, along with Soviet dictator Joseph Stalin, and was the result of human actions". In the same poll, 22.9% of those polled fully or partially agreed with the view that the famine was caused by natural circumstances, but 50.5% disagreed with that. Furthermore, 45.4% of respondents believed that the Holodomor was "a deliberate attempt to destroy the Ukrainian nation" and 26.2% rather or completely disagreed with this.

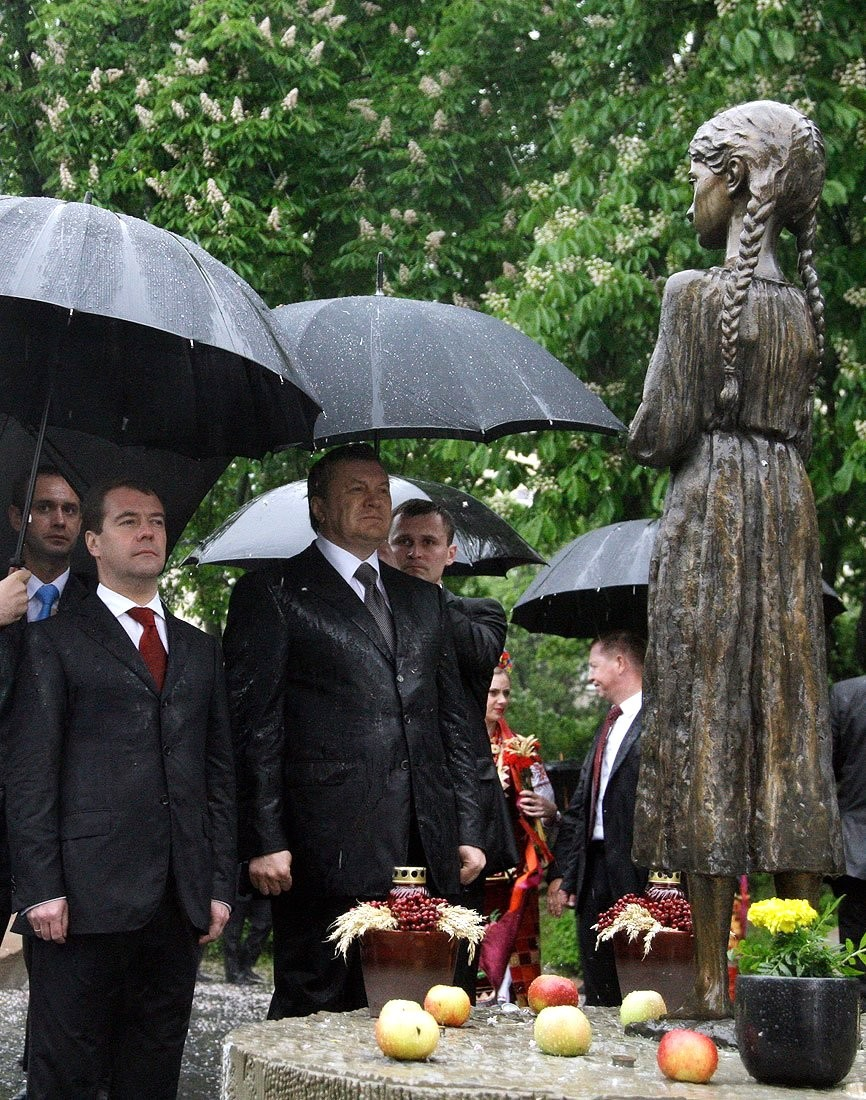
Ukrainian President Viktor Yanukovych (right) and Russian President Dmitry Medvedev (left) near Memorial to the Holodomor Victims in Kyiv on 17 May 2010. Russia has since changed its policy and started downplaying or denying the Holodomor.

In a November 2021 poll, 85% agreed that the Holodomor was a genocide of Ukrainians. A poll undertaken in Ukraine in 2022 recorded 93% agreeing that the Holodomor was a genocide with 3% disagreeing.

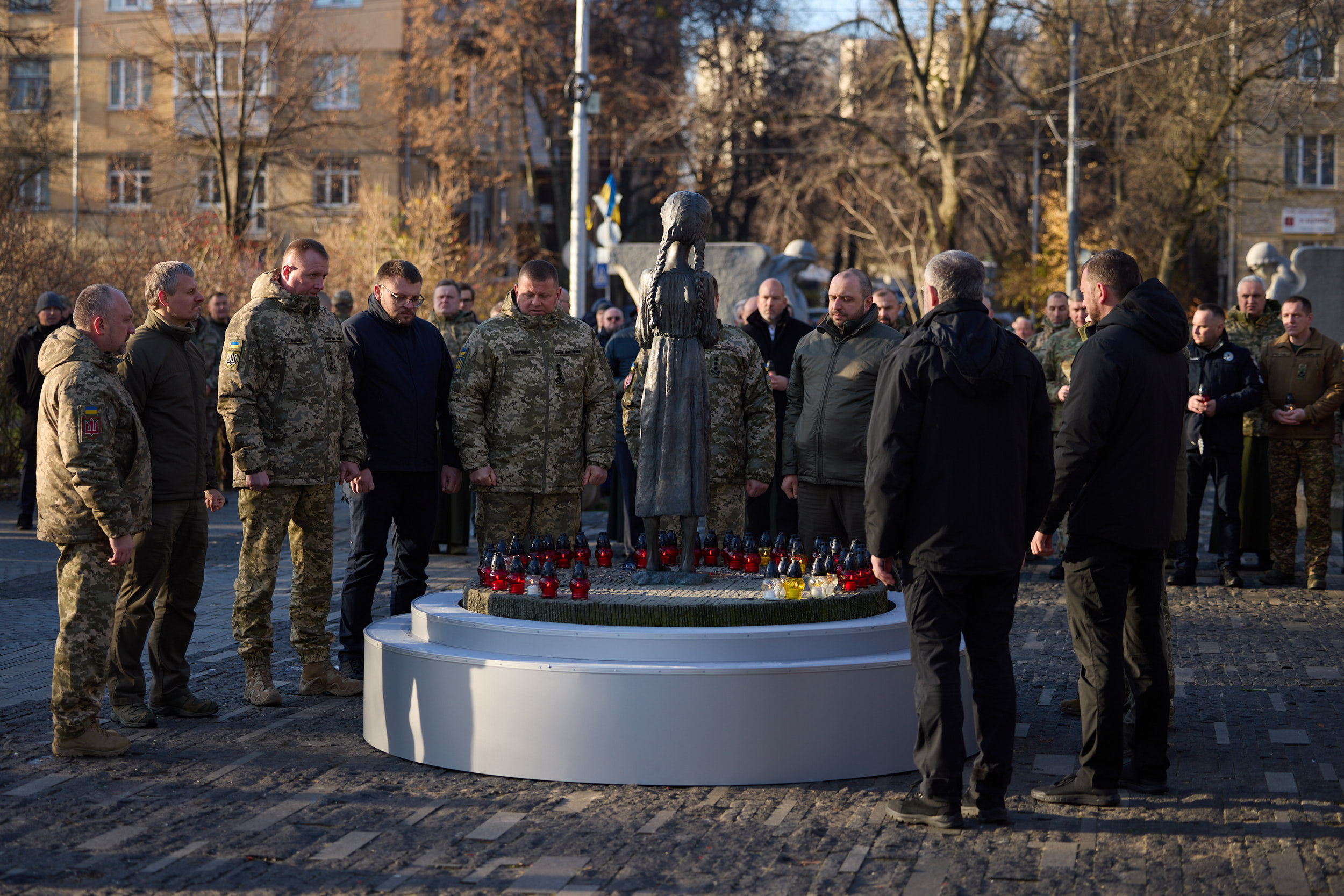
Ukraine's Commander-in-Chief Valerii Zaluzhnyi at an event to mark the 90th anniversary of the Holodomor, 25 November 2023

On 19 October 2022, Russian occupation authorities dismantled a Holodomor monument in the destroyed city of Mariupol on the basis that it was not a monument but a symbol of "disinformation at the state level". Ukrainian culture minister Oleksandr Tkachenko said "such acts signifies that the current Russian regime is a true successor to the one guilty of crimes against humanity and the Ukrainian people".

=== Germany ===
Perhaps the first public commemoration of victims was a procession held by Ukrainians displaced in the Second World War in 1948 in Munich, the administrative centre of the American zone of occupation in Germany. The most recent countries to recognize Holodomor as a genocide are Germany and Vatican City.

=== Canada ===
The first public monument to the Holodomor was erected and dedicated in 1983 outside City Hall in Edmonton, Alberta, Canada, to mark the 50th anniversary of the famine-genocide. Since then, the fourth Saturday in November has in many jurisdictions been marked as the official day of remembrance for people who died as a result of the 1932–1933 Holodomor and political repression.

On 22 November 2008, Ukrainian Canadians marked the beginning of National Holodomor Awareness Week and Holodomor Memorial Day (the fourth Friday of November in Schools and the fourth Saturday of November globally). The success of this initiative is attributed to Valentina Kuryliw, as chair of the National Holodomor Education Committee of the Ukrainian Canadian Congress. Citizenship, Immigration, and Multiculturalism Minister Jason Kenney attended a vigil in Kyiv. In November 2010, Prime Minister Stephen Harper visited the Holodomor memorial in Kyiv, although Ukrainian President Viktor Yanukovych did not join him.

Saskatchewan became the first jurisdiction in North America and the first province in Canada to recognize the Holodomor as a genocide. The Ukrainian Famine and Genocide (Holodomor) Memorial Day Act was introduced in the Saskatchewan Legislature on 6 May 2008, and received royal assent on 14 May 2008.

On 9 April 2009, the province of Ontario unanimously passed bill 147, "The Holodomor Memorial Day Act", which calls for the fourth Saturday in November to be a day of remembrance. This was the first piece of legislation in the Province's history to be introduced with Tri-Partisan sponsorship: the joint initiators of the bill were Dave Levac, MPP for Brant (Liberal Party); Cheri DiNovo, MPP for Parkdale–High Park (NDP); and Frank Klees, MPP for Newmarket–Aurora (PC). MPP Levac was made a chevalier of Ukraine's Order of Merit.

On 2 June 2010, the province of Quebec unanimously passed bill 390, "Memorial Day Act on the great Ukrainian famine and genocide (the Holodomor)".

On 25 September 2010, a new Holodomor monument was unveiled at St. Mary's Ukrainian Catholic Church, Mississauga, Ontario, Canada, bearing the inscription "Holodomor: Genocide By Famine in Ukraine 1932–1933" and a section in Ukrainian bearing mention of the 10 million victims.

On 21 September 2014, a statue entitled "Bitter Memories of Childhood" was unveiled outside the Manitoba Legislative Building in Winnipeg to memorialize the Holodomor.

A monument to the Holodomor has been erected on Calgary's Memorial Drive, itself originally designated to honour Canadian servicemen of the First World War. The monument is located in the district of Renfrew near Ukrainian Pioneer Park, which pays tribute to the contributions of Ukrainian immigrants to Canada.

On 21 October 2018, a memorial statue was unveiled on Canada Boulevard in Exhibition Place of Toronto. The site provides a place for an annual memorial on the fourth Saturday of November.

=== Poland ===
On 16 March 2006, the Senate of the Republic of Poland paid tribute to the victims of the Great Famine and declared it an act of genocide, expressing solidarity with the Ukrainian nation and its efforts to commemorate this crime.

On 22 January 2015, a Holodomor monument was erected in the city of Lublin.

=== United States ===
The Ukrainian Weekly reported a meeting taking place on 27 February 1982 in the parish center of the Ukrainian Catholic National Shrine of the Holy Family in commemoration of the 50th Anniversary of the Great Famine caused by the Soviet authorities. On 20 March 1982, the Ukrainian Weekly also reported a multi-ethnic community meeting that was held on 15 February on the North Shore Drive at the Ukrainian Village in Chicago to commemorate the famine which took the lives of seven million Ukrainians. Other events in commemoration were held in other places around the United States as well.

On 29 May 2008, the city of Baltimore held a candlelight commemoration for the Holodomor at the War Memorial Plaza in front of City Hall. This ceremony was part of the larger international journey of the "International Holodomor Remembrance Torch", which began in Kyiv and made its way through thirty-three countries. Twenty-two other US cities were also visited during the tour. Then-Mayor Sheila Dixon presided over the ceremony and declared 29 May to be "Ukrainian Genocide Remembrance Day in Baltimore". She referred to the Holodomor "among the worst cases of man's inhumanity towards man".

On 2 December 2008, a ceremony was held in Washington, D.C., for the Holodomor Memorial. On 13 November 2009, U.S. President Barack Obama released a statement on Ukrainian Holodomor Remembrance Day. In this, he said that "remembering the victims of the man-made catastrophe of Holodomor provides us an opportunity to reflect upon the plight of all those who have suffered the consequences of extremism and tyranny around the world". NSC Spokesman Mike Hammer released a similar statement on 20 November 2010.

In 2011, the American day of remembrance of Holodomor was held on 19 November. The statement released by the White House Press Secretary reflects on the significance of this date, stating that "in the wake of this brutal and deliberate attempt to break the will of the people of Ukraine, Ukrainians showed great courage and resilience. The establishment of a proud and independent Ukraine twenty years ago shows the remarkable depth of the Ukrainian people's love of freedom and independence".

On 7 November 2015, the Holodomor Genocide Memorial was opened in Washington D.C.

In the 115th Congress, both the United States Senate and the United States House of Representatives adopted resolutions commemorating the 85th anniversary of the Holodomor, "the Soviet Union's manmade famine that it committed against the people of Ukraine in 1932 and 1933." The Senate Resolution, S. Res. 435 (115th Congress) was adopted on 3 October 2018 and stated that the U.S. Senate "solemnly remembers the 85th anniversary of the Holodomor of 1932–1933 and extends its deepest sympathies to the victims, survivors, and families of this tragedy."

On 11 December 2018, the United States House of Representatives adopted H. Res. 931 (115th Congress), a resolution extending the House's "deepest sympathies to the victims and survivors of the Holodomor of 1932–1933, and their families" and condemned "the systematic violations of human rights, including the freedom of self-determination and freedom of speech, of the Ukrainian people by the Soviet Government." On 12 May 2022, and at the 117th United States congress, a new H. Res. 1109 was adopted, recognizing the Holodomor as a genocide and the resolution to serve as a reminder of the repressive Soviet policies including the blockade policy that prevented the delivery of humanitarian aid and people from escaping.

=== On film ===
The 2019 feature film Mr Jones, starring James Norton and directed by Agnieszka Holland, focuses on Jones and his investigation of and reporting on the Ukrainian famine in the face of political and journalistic opposition. In January 2019, it was selected to compete for the Golden Bear at the 69th Berlin International Film Festival. The film won Grand Prix Golden Lions at the 44th Gdynia Film Festival in September 2019.

=== Vatican City ===
On 23 November 2022, Pope Francis held a ceremony to remember the victims of the famine. He referred to the Holodomor as a genocide. "Let us remember long-suffering Ukraine. This Saturday marks the anniversary of the terrible genocide of the Holodomor in 1932–1933 artificially caused by Stalin. Let us pray for the victims of this genocide and pray for the all Ukrainians, the children, the women and the elderly, the babies, who are today suffering the martyrdom of aggression."

=== Holodomor memorials ===
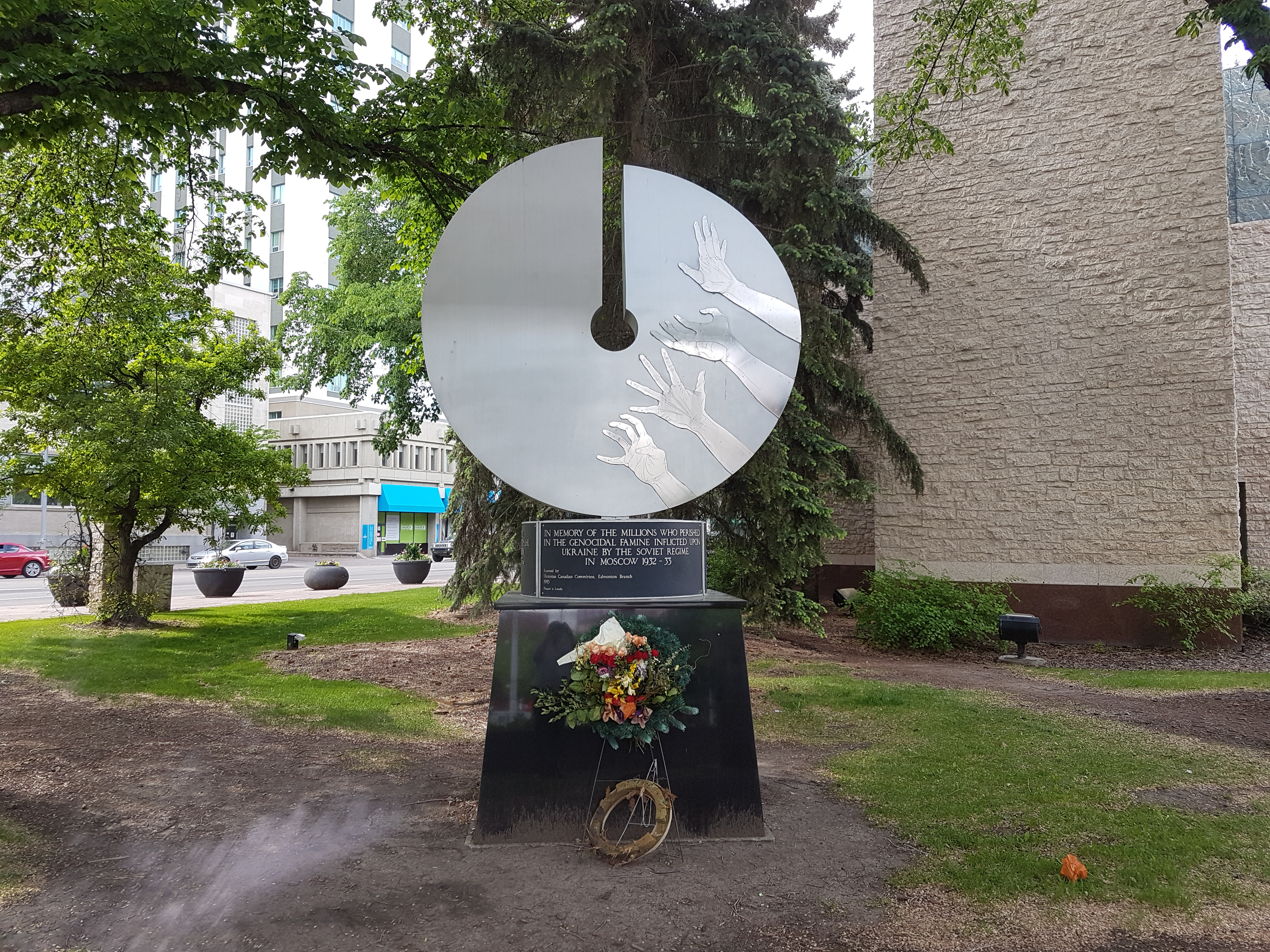
First in the world: 1983 Holodomor Monument in Edmonton, Canada

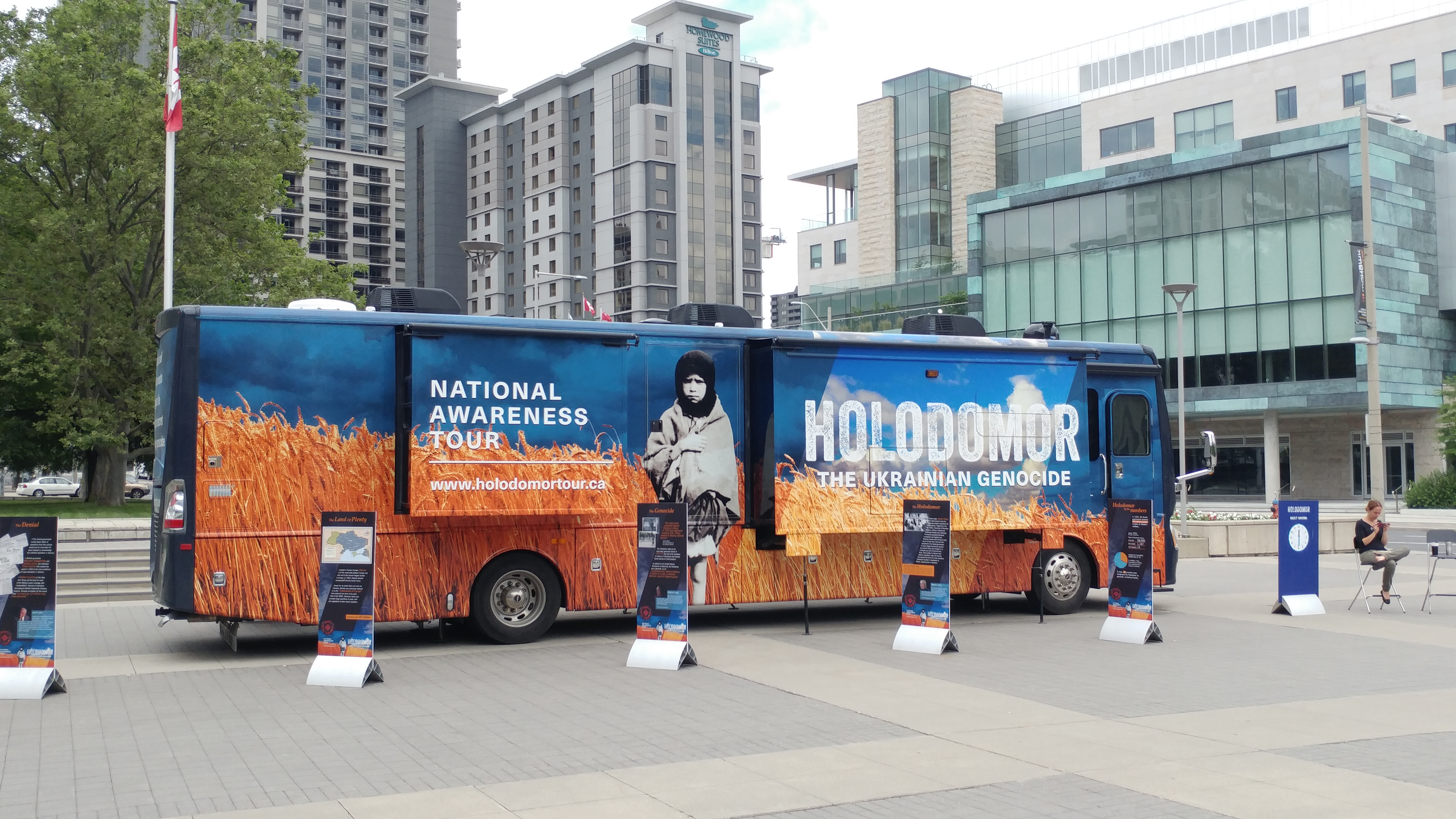
Touring van devoted to Holodomor education, seen in Hamilton, Ontario, Canada, 2017

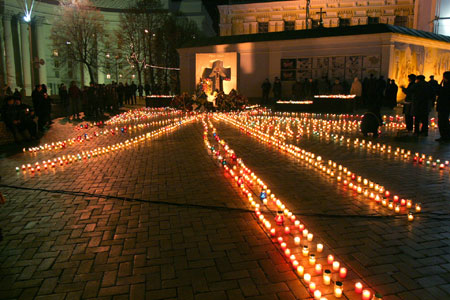
"Light the candle" event at a Holodomor memorial in Kyiv

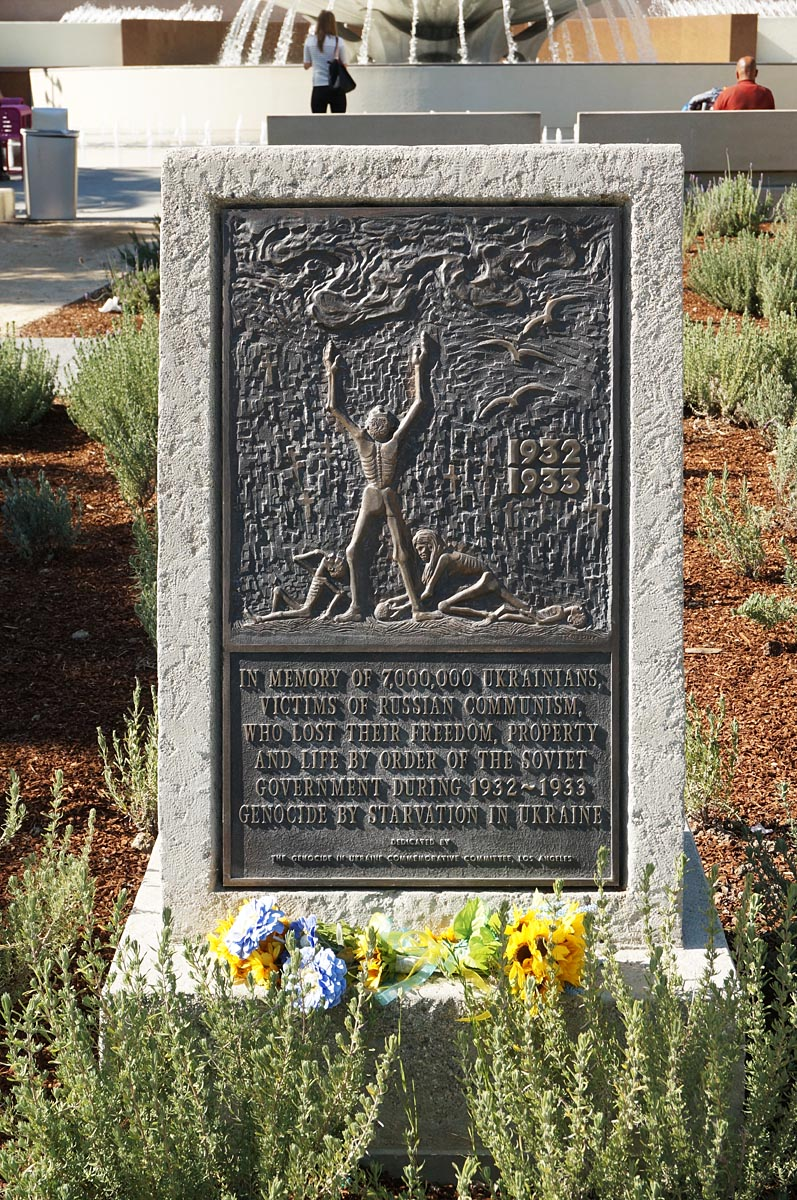
Plaque in Grand Park, Los Angeles, California, United States

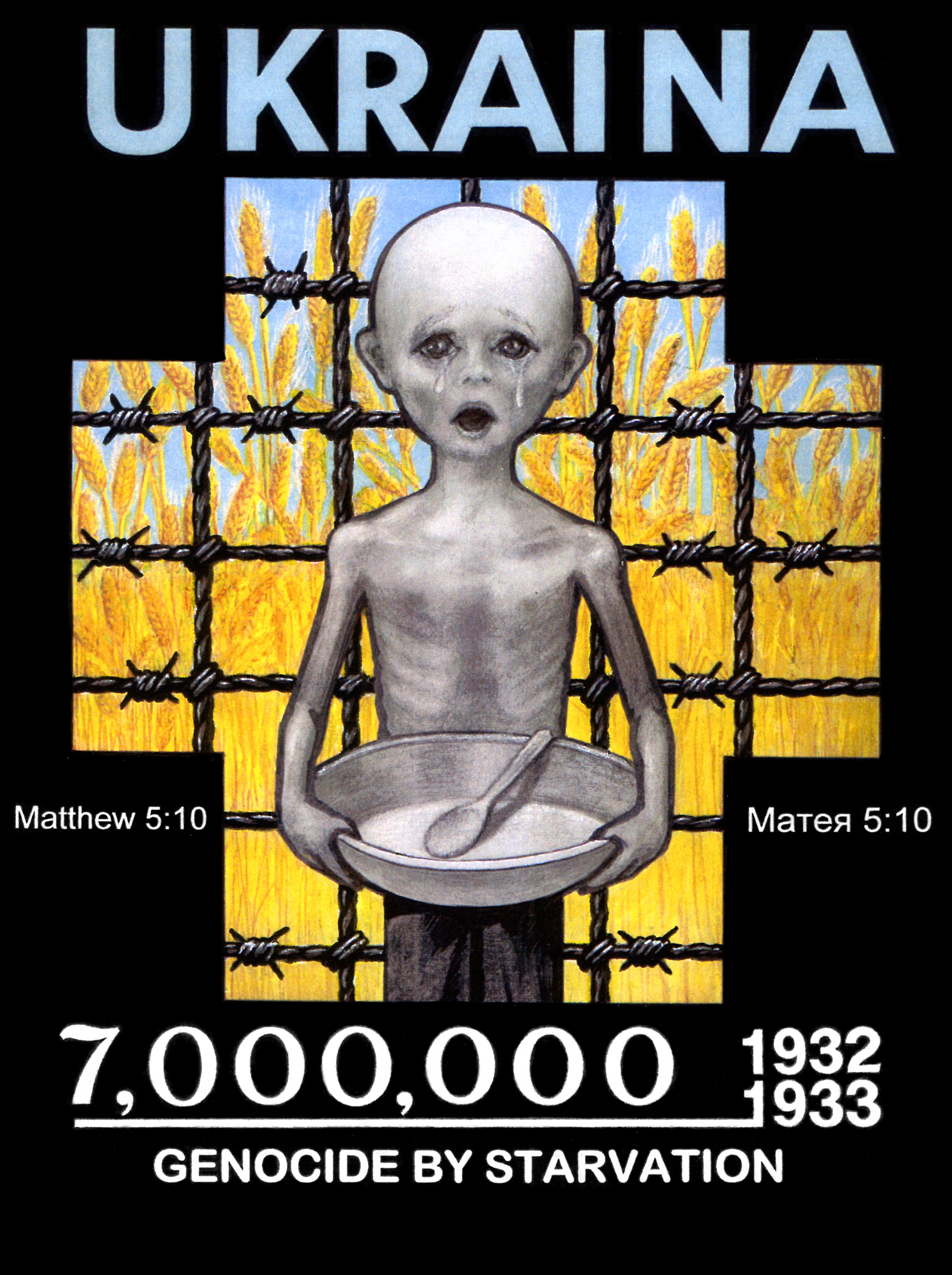
Poster by Australian artist Leonid Denysenko

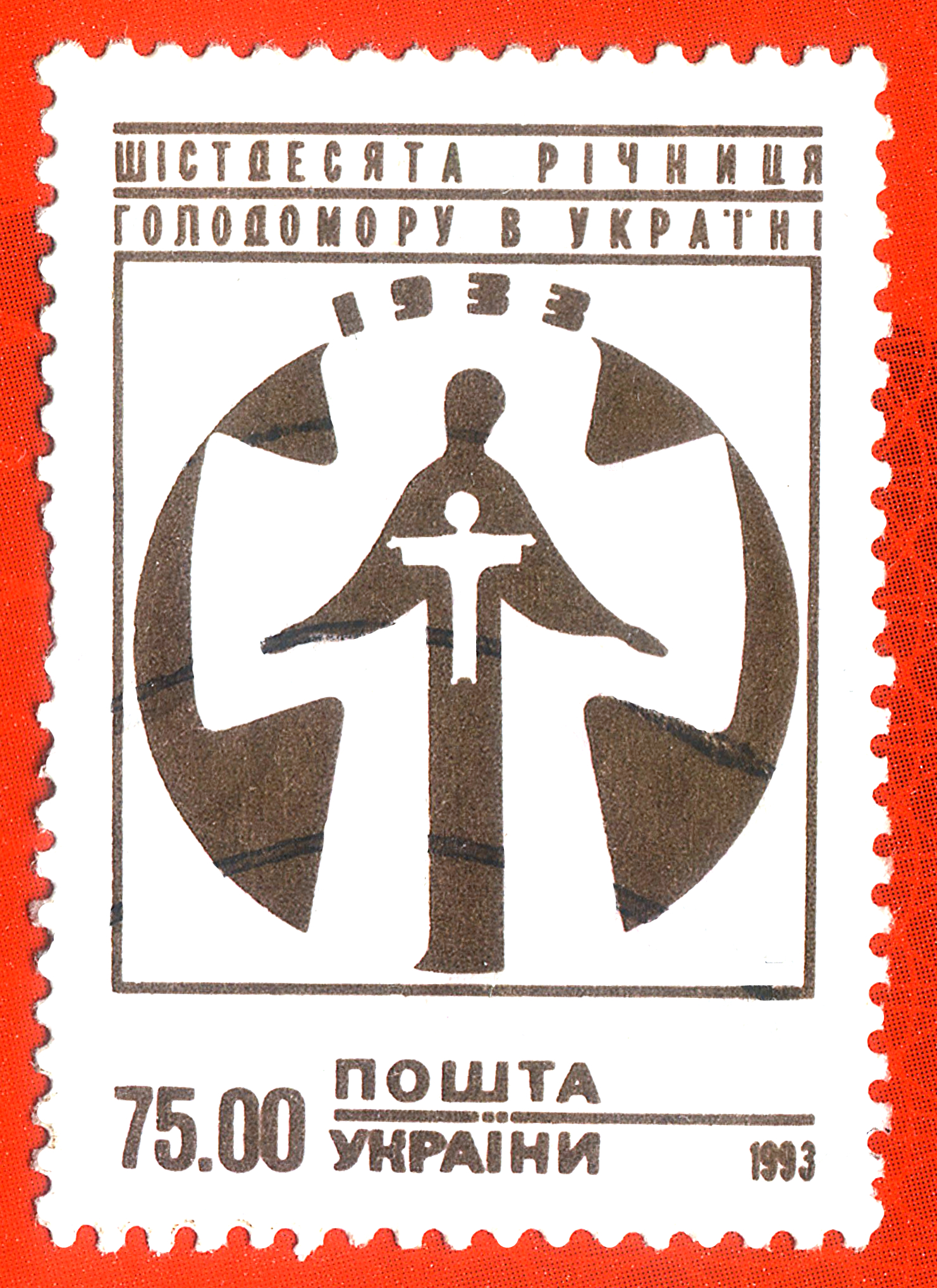
Stamp of Ukraine, 1993

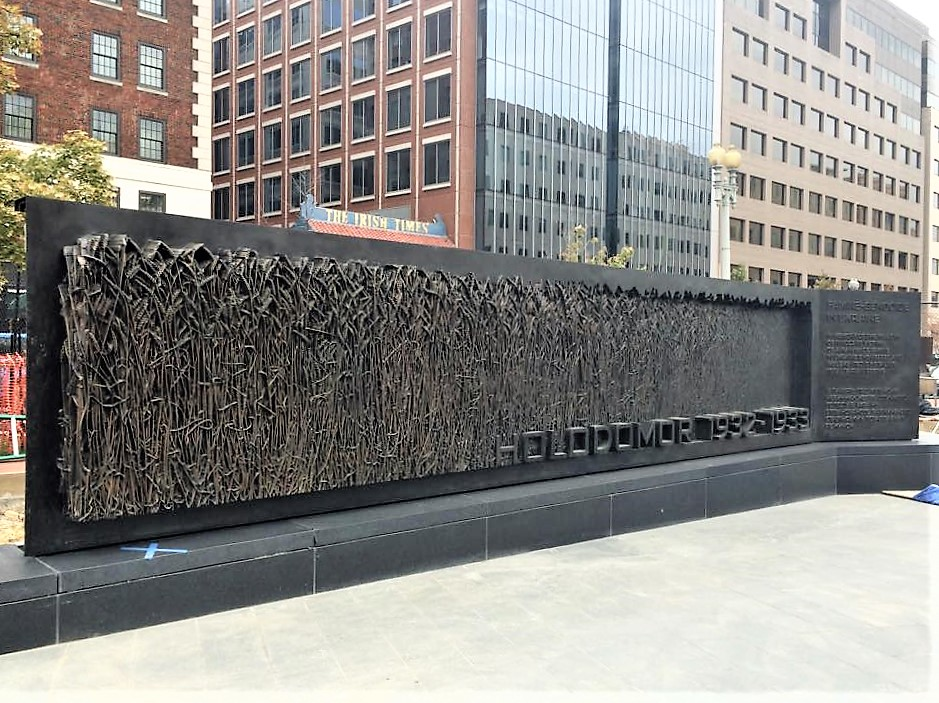
Holodomor Memorial to Victims of the Ukrainian Famine-Genocide of 1932–1933, Washington DC.

== In culture and the arts ==
=== Cinema ===
- Harvest of Despair (1984), directed by Slavko Nowytski (documentary film) – Video on YouTube
- Famine-33 (1991), directed by Oles Yanchuk
- The Guide (2014), directed by Oles Sanin
- Child 44 (2015), directed by Daniel Espinosa, based on the book by Tom Rob Smith – briefly describes the Holodomor
- Bitter Harvest (2017), directed by George Mendeluk
- Mr. Jones (2019), directed by Agnieszka Holland
- Seeds of Hunger (2023), directed by Guillaume Ribot (documentary film)
- Capital of Despair: Holodomor Chroniclers (2023), a documentary series directed by Roman Barabash – Episode 1 on YouTube (in Ukrainian, English subtitles)

=== Literature ===
Ulas Samchuk's novel Maria (1934) is dedicated to the Holodomor (English translation published 1952).

Katherine Marsh's book The Lost Year: A Survival Story of the Ukrainian Famine (2023) was a finalist in the 2023 National Book Award for Young People's Literature.

=== Theatre ===
The play Holodomor premiered in Tehran, Iran in February 2021.

== See also ==
- Bibliography of the Holodomor
- Bibliography of Ukrainian history
- Bibliography of Stalinism and the Soviet Union
- Outline of Ukrainian history
- Outline of genocide studies
- Outline of the Holodomor
- 1921–1923 famine in Ukraine
- Allegations of genocide of Ukrainians in the Russian invasion of Ukraine
- Double genocide theory
- Droughts and famines in Russia and the Soviet Union
- Excess mortality in the Soviet Union under Joseph Stalin
- Holodomor: The Unknown Ukrainian Tragedy (1932–1933)
- Hunger Plan
- Kazakh famine of 1930–1933
- Bibliography of the Asharshylyk
- List of massacres in Ukraine
- Mass killings under communist regimes
- National Museum of the Holodomor-Genocide

== Bibliography ==
- Andriewsky, Olga (January 2015). "Towards a Decentred History: The Study of the Holodomor and Ukrainian Historiography". East/West: Journal of Ukrainian Studies. 2 (1). University of Alberta: 17. doi:10.21226/T2301N.
- AnyDay Guide (25 November 2017). "Remembrance Day for the Victims of Holodomors in Ukraine / November 25, 2017". Archived from the original on 1 December 2017.
- Applebaum, Anne (2017). Red Famine: Stalin's War on Ukraine. Knopf Doubleday Publishing Group. ISBN 978-0-385-53886-2.
- Balachuk, Iryna (19 October 2022). "Occupiers dismantle monument to victims of Holodomor in Mariupol". Ukrainska Pravda. Archived from the original on 17 January 2023.
- Barkan, Elazar; Cole, Elizabeth A.; Struve, Kai (2007). Shared History, Divided Memory: Jews and Others in Soviet-Occupied Poland, 1939–1941. Leipziger Universitätsverlag. pp. 120–121. ISBN 978-3-86583-240-5.
- Bayer, Alexei (8 February 2014). "Ukraine and Ireland: Overcoming Mighty Neighbors". The Globalist. Archived from the original on 5 May 2019.
- Beal, Fred Erwin (2021) [originally published in 1937, New York: Hillman-Curl.]. Proletarian Journey: New England, Gastonia, Moscow. Hassell Street Press. ISBN 978-1-01-433038-3.
- Berezhkov, Valentin M. (1993). Kak ya stal perevodchikom Stalina Как я стал переводчиком Сталина [How I became Stalin's translator] (in Russian). Moscow: "ДЭМ" (DEM). p. 317. ISBN 5-85207-044-0.
- Berg, Tabitha (6 June 2008). "International Holodomor Remembrance Torch in Baltimore Commemorates Ukrainian Genocide". eNewsChannels. Archived from the original on 5 January 2010.
- Bihun, Yaro (7 December 2008). "Site of Ukrainian Genocide Memorial in D.C. is dedicated" (PDF). The Ukrainian Weekly. 76 (49): 1, 8. Archived (PDF) from the original on 2 March 2014.
- Bilinsky, Yaroslav (1999). "Was the Ukrainian Famine of 1932–1933 Genocide?". Journal of Genocide Research. 1 (2): 147–156. doi:10.1080/14623529908413948. Archived from the original on 15 June 2008.
- Blow, Peter (15 April 1985). "Film: Harvest of Despair: The 1932-33 Famine in Ukraine". Nowytski, Slavko (director); Luhovy, Yuri and Novytski, S. (producers). Toronto: Ukrainian Canadian Research and Documentation Centre. Archived from the original on 17 December 2022. "Documentary on YouTube"
- Bociurkiw, Bohdan R. (1982). "Soviet Religious Policy in the Ukraine in Historical Perspective". Occasional Papers on Religion in Eastern Europe. 2 (3). Archived from the original on 6 March 2023.
- Boriak, Hennadii; von Hagen, Mark (2009). Sources for the Study of the 'Great Famine' in Ukraine. The Holodomor Series. Cambridge, MA: Ukrainian Studies Fund. ISBN 978-0-940465-06-0.
- Bradley, Lara (3 January 1999). "Ukraine's 'Forced Famine' Officially Recognized". The Sudbury Star. Sudbury, Ontario, Canada. Archived from the original on 8 March 2012 – via reprint at ArtUkraine.com.
- Brown, Mark (13 November 2009). "1930s journalist Gareth Jones to have story retold". The Guardian. Archived from the original on 11 December 2021.
- Busel, Vyacheslav T., ed. (2004) [2001]. "holodomor" голодомор. Velykyy tlumachnyy slovnyk suchasnoyi ukrayinsʹkoyi movy Великий тлумачний словник сучасної української мови [Great Explanatory Dictionary of Modern Ukrainian] (in Ukrainian). Kyiv: Perun. ISBN 978-966-569-013-9. Archived from the original on 3 June 2016. "Shtuchnyy holod, orhanizovanyy u velycheznykh masshtabakh zlochynnoyu vladoyu proty naselennya vlasnoyi krayiny." Штучний голод, організований у величезних масштабах злочинною владою проти населення власної країни. [An artificial famine organized on a huge scale by a criminal government against the population of its own country.]
- Chamberlin, William Henry (1933). "The Balance Sheet of the Five Year Plan". Foreign Affairs. 11 (3): 458–469. doi:10.2307/20030526. ISSN 0015-7120. JSTOR 20030526.
- Conquest, Robert (2001). Reflections on a Ravaged Century (New ed.). New York: W. W. Norton & Company. ISBN 978-0-393-32086-2.
- Conquest, Robert (2002) [1986]. The Harvest Of Sorrow: Soviet Collectivisation and the Terror-Famine. London: Pimlico. ISBN 978-0-7126-9750-7.
- CTV news (22 November 2008). "Ukrainian-Canadians mark famine's 75th anniversary". CTV.ca. Archived from the original on 18 October 2012.
- Davies, Norman (2006). Europe East and West. London: Jonathan Cape. ISBN 978-0-224-06924-3. Archived from the original on 19 December 2023 – via Google Books.
- Davies, Robert W.; Tauger, Mark B.; Wheatcroft, Stephen G. (1995). "Stalin, Grain Stocks and the Famine of 1932-1933". Slavic Review. 54 (3): 642–57. doi:10.2307/2501740. JSTOR 2501740. S2CID 163790684. Archived from the original on 25 December 2022.
- Davies, Robert W.; Wheatcroft, Stephen G. (2002). "The Soviet Famine of 1932–33 and the Crisis in Agriculture" (PDF). In Wheatcroft, Stephen G. (ed.). Challenging Traditional Views of Russian History. Houndmills: Palgrave Macmillan. ISBN 978-0-333-75461-0. Archived (PDF) from the original on 14 May 2021.
- Davies, Robert; Wheatcroft, Stephen (2004). The Years of Hunger: Soviet Agriculture, 1931–1933. The Industrialisation of Soviet Russia. Vol. 5. Palgrave Macmillan. ISBN 978-0-230-27397-9. OCLC 1075104809.
- Davies, Robert; Wheatcroft, Stephen (2006). "Stalin and the Soviet Famine of 1932–33: A Reply to Ellman" (PDF). Europe-Asia Studies. 58 (4): 625–633. doi:10.1080/09668130600652217. JSTOR 20451229. S2CID 145729808. Archived (PDF) from the original on 30 June 2019.
- Demoscope Weekly (January 2012). "Vsesoyuznaya perepis' naseleniya 1939 goda: Ukrainskaya SSR" Всесоюзная перепись населения 1939 года: Украинская ССР [All-Union census of the population of 1939: Ukrainian SSR] (in Russian). Institute of Demography, National Research University Higher School of Economics. Archived from the original on 19 January 2012.
- Deutsche Welle (DW) staff (15 December 2022). "European Parliament recognizes Ukraine Holodomor as genocide". DW broadcasting. Archived from the original on 17 December 2022.
- de Waal, Alex; Murdoch, Catriona (29 March 2022). "Russia could be guilty of starvation crimes in Ukraine. We must act". The Guardian. Archived from the original on 31 March 2022.
- Diamond, Yonah; et al. (27 May 2022). "Independent Legal Analysis of the Russian Federation's Breaches of the Genocide Convention in Ukraine and the Duty to Prevent" (PDF). New Lines Institute for Strategy and Policy; Raoul Wallenberg Centre for Human Rights. Archived (PDF) from the original on 16 June 2022.
- Dolot, Miron (1985). Execution by Hunger: The Hidden Holocaust. New York: W. W. Norton & Company. ISBN 978-0-393-30416-9.
- Ellman, Michael (September 2005). "The Role of Leadership Perceptions and of Intent in the Soviet Famine of 1931 – 1934". Europe-Asia Studies. 57 (6): 823–841. doi:10.1080/09668130500199392. S2CID 13880089.
- Ellman, Michael (June 2007). "Stalin and the Soviet famine of 1932 – 33 Revisited". Europe-Asia Studies. 59 (4). Routledge: 663–693. doi:10.1080/09668130701291899. S2CID 53655536.
- Engerman, David C. (2009) [2003]. Modernization from the Other Shore: American Intellectuals and the Romance of Russian Development. Cambridge, Massachusetts: Harvard University Press. ISBN 978-0-674-03652-9 – via Google Books.
- European Pravda (15 December 2022). "European Parliament Recognises Holodomor as Genocide of Ukrainian People". www.eurointegration.com.ua (in English, Russian, and Ukrainian). Archived from the original on 15 December 2022.
- Fawkes, Helen (24 November 2006). "Legacy of famine divides Ukraine". BBC News. Archived from the original on 28 March 2012.
- Finn, Peter (27 April 2008). "Aftermath of a Soviet Famine". The Washington Post. Archived from the original on 5 November 2012.
- Fitzpatrick, Sheila (1994). Stalin's Peasants: Resistance and Survival in the Russian Village After Collectivization. Oxford University Press.
- Fitzpatrick, Sheila (2015). "Impact of the Opening of Soviet Archives on Western Scholarship on Soviet Social History". The Russian Review. 74 (3): 377–400. doi:10.1111/russ.12021. ISSN 0036-0341. JSTOR 43662294.
- Getty, J. Arch (2000). "The Future Did Not Work". The Atlantic. Archived from the original on 17 October 2021. "Similarly, the overwhelming weight of opinion among scholars working in the new archives (including Courtois's co-editor Werth) is that the terrible famine of the 1930s was the result of Stalinist bungling and rigidity rather than some genocidal plan."
- Getty, J. Arch (August 2018). "New Sources and Old Narratives". Contemporary European History. 27 (3): 450–455. doi:10.1017/S0960777318000322. ISSN 0960-7773. S2CID 149507259.
- Gorbachev, Mikhail Sergeevich (2006). Manifesto for the Earth: action now for peace, global justice and a sustainable future. Clairview Books. p. 10. ISBN 1-905570-02-3.
- Gorbunova, Viktoriia; Klymchuk, Vitalii (2020). "The Psychological Consequences of the Holodomor in Ukraine". East/West: Journal of Ukrainian Studies. 7 (2): 33–68. doi:10.21226/ewjus609. S2CID 228999786.
- Government of Saskatchewan (14 November 2013). "Saskatchewan recognises genocide during Holodomor Remembrance Week | News and Media | Government of Saskatchewan". Saskatchewan.ca. Archived from the original on 6 May 2015.
- Graziosi, Andrea (2004). "The Soviet 1931–1933 Famines and the Ukrainian Holodomor: Is a New Interpretation Possible, and What Would Its Consequences Be?" (pdf). Harvard Ukrainian Studies. 27 (1/4): 97–115. ISSN 0363-5570. JSTOR 41036863. Archived from the original on 7 December 2022.
- Graziosi, Andrea (2005). "Les Famines Soviétiques de 1931–1933 et le Holodomor Ukrainien" [The Soviet Famines of 1931–1933 and the Ukrainian Holodomor]. Cahiers du monde russe et soviétique (in French). 46 (3): 453–472. doi:10.4000/monderusse.8817.
- Graziosi, Andrea; McGowan, Mark G.; Totten, Samuel; Shirinian, George; Apsel, Joyce (14 April 2020). "Symposium: Starvation As A Political Tool From The Nineteenth To The Twenty-First Century: The Irish Famine, The Armenian Genocide, The Ukrainian Holodomor And Genocide By Attrition In The Nuba Mountains Of Sudan". HREC Education [Holodomor Research and Education Consortium]. Canadian Institute of Ukrainian Studies. Archived from the original on 22 August 2021.
- Hadzewycz, Roma; Zarycky, George B.; Kolomayets, Martha, eds. (1983). The Great Famine in Ukraine: The Unknown Holocaust. Jersey City, NJ: Ukrainian National Association.
- Harvard Ukrainian Research Institute (2013). "The Great Famine Project: Blacklisted Localities (Gallery)". gis.huri.harvard.edu. Archived from the original on 5 November 2022.
- Harvard Ukrainian Research Institute (2018). "The Great Famine Project: Total Direct Famine Losses of Population per 1,000 by Raion in Ukraine for 1933". gis.huri.harvard.edu. Archived from the original on 5 November 2022.
- Harvard Ukrainian Research Institute (2022). "The Great Famine Project: New Insights". Archived from the original on 16 January 2022.
- Horbachov, Dmytro (1998). "Fullest Expression of Pure Feeling". Welcome to Ukraine (1). Archived from the original on 3 March 2016.
- Hryshko, Vasyl (1983) [1976]. Carynnyk, Marco (ed.). The Ukrainian Holocaust of 1933. Toronto: Bahrianyi Foundation. ISBN 978-0-9691830-1-3.
- InfoUkes Staff (26 April 2009) [28 November 2006]. "The Artificial Famine/Genocide (Holodomor) in Ukraine 1932–33". InfoUkes. Archived from the original on 24 November 2016.
- Institute of History of Ukraine (1990). Pyrih, Ruslan Y.; Kentii, Anatoly V.; Komarova, Irina L.; Lozytskyi, V. S.; Solovyova, A. A. (eds.). Documents 1-132 extracted from "Голодомор 1932–33 років в Україні: документи і матеріали"/ Упорядник Руслан Пиріг; НАН України.Ін-т історії України.-К.:Вид.дім "Києво-Могилянська академія" [Documents 1-132 extracted from "The famine of 1932-1933 in Ukraine: through the eyes of historians, in the language of documents"] (in Ukrainian). Kyiv: Kyiv-Mohyla Academy. Archived from the original on 15 August 2012. "See also full book"
- Institute of History of Ukraine (1990). Pyrih, Ruslan Y.; Kentii, Anatoly V.; Komarova, Irina L.; Lozytskyi, V. S.; Solovyova, A. A. (eds.). Documents 343-403 extracted from "Голодомор 1932–33 років в Україні: документи і матеріали"/ Упорядник Руслан Пиріг; НАН України.Ін-т історії України.-К.:Вид.дім "Києво-Могилянська академія" [Documents 343-403 extracted from "The famine of 1932-1933 in Ukraine: through the eyes of historians, in the language of documents"] (in Ukrainian). Kyiv: Kyiv-Mohyla Academy. Archived from the original on 15 August 2012. "See also full book"
- Interfax Ukraine (14 November 2009). "Remembrance of Holodomor in Ukraine will help prevent such tragedy in future, says Obama". Interfax-Ukraine. Archived from the original on 1 March 2014.
- Interfax Ukraine (21 January 2010). "Sentence to Stalin, his comrades for organizing Holodomor takes effect in Ukraine". Kyiv Post. Archived from the original on 3 March 2014.
- Interfax Ukraine (20 November 2013). "Poll: Almost two-thirds of Ukrainians believe famine of 1932–1933 was organized by Stalinist regime". Interfax-Ukraine. Archived from the original on 4 March 2016.
- Jones, Adam (2017). Genocide: A Comprehensive Introduction (3rd ed.). New York, NY: Routledge. ISBN 978-1-138-82384-6. "Holodomor – the Ukrainian "famine-extermination" of 1932–1933 at the hands of Stalin's Soviet regime (Chapter 5); "a compound word combining the root holod 'hunger' with the verbal root mor 'extinguish', 'exterminate' (Lubomyr Hajda, Harvard University)."
- Kasianov, Georgiy (2010). Danse macabre: голод 1932-1933 років у політиці, масовій свідомості та історіографії (1980-ті--початок 2000-х) [Danse macabre: the famine of 1932–1933 in politics, public consciousness and historiography (the 1980s to the early 2000s)] (in Ukrainian). Our Time.
- Kharkiv Oblast secretary (9 April 1933). "Kharkiv Oblast State Archive Ф. П - 58, catalogue 1, file 59, lists 146-147, 152". Archived from the original on 1 September 2010.
- Klady, Leonard (1985) [originally published by Winnipeg Free Press, 26 October 1984]. "Famine Film Harvest of Despair". Forum: A Ukrainian Review (61). Scranton: Ukrainian Fraternal Association. Archived from the original on 4 January 2011 – via InfoUkes.
- Kotkin, Stephen (8 November 2017). "Terrible Talent: Studying Stalin". The American Interest (Interview). Interviewed by Richard Aldous. Archived from the original on 8 November 2021.
- Kovalchuk, Yaroslav (3 June 2026). "From a Person to a Genocide: The Origins of the Word Holodomor". Україна Модерна [Modern Ukraine]. Archived from the original on 1 October 2026.
- Kravchenko, Ye (1 July 2020). "The Concept of Demographic Losses in the Holodomor Studies". Vìsnik - Kiïvsʹkij nacìonalʹnij unìversitet ìmenì Tarasa Ševčenka: Ìstorìâ (144): 30–34. doi:10.17721/1728-2640.2020.144.6. ISSN 1728-2640. S2CID 226687490. Archived from the original on 1 October 2023.
- Kulchytsky, Stalislav (22 November 2002). "Skilʹky nas zahynulo vid Holodomoru 1933 roku?" Скільки нас загинуло від Голодомору 1933 року? [How many of us perished in Holodomor in 1933]. Dzerkalo Tyzhnia (in Ukrainian).
- Kulchytsky, Stanislav; Yefimenko, Hennadiy (2003). "Kulchytsky pages 42-64" ( (PDF)). Demohrafichni naslidky holodomoru 1933 r. v Ukrayini. Vsesoyuznyy perepys 1937 r. v Ukrayini: dokumenty ta materialy Демографічні наслідки голодомору 1933 р. в Україні. Всесоюзний перепис 1937 р. в Україні: документи та матеріали [Demographic consequences of the 1933 Holodomor in Ukraine. The all-Union census of 1937 in Ukraine: Documents and Materials] (in Ukrainian). Kyiv: Institute of History. pp. 42–63. ISBN 978-966-02-3014-9. Archived from the original on 23 May 2013.
- Kulchytsky, Stanislav (22 August 2003). "Prychyny holodu 1933 roku v Ukrayini po storinkakh odniyeyi pidzabutoyi knyhy" Причини голоду 1933 року в Україні по сторінках однієї підзабутої книги [Reasons for the 1933 famine in Ukraine according to the pages of one all but forgotten book]. Dzerkalo Tyzhnia (in Ukrainian) (16). "During the hearings, the Ukrainian politician Stefan Khmara said, 'I would like to address the scientists, particularly, Stanislav Kulchytsky, who attempts to mark down the number of victims and counts them as 3–3.5 million. I studied these questions analysing the demographic statistics as early as in 1970s and concluded that the number of victims was no less than 7 million'."
- Kulchytsky, Stanislav (2018). The Famine of 1932–1933 in Ukraine: An Anatomy of the Holodomor. Translated by Kinsella, Ali. Edmonton, Toronto: Canadian Institute of Ukrainian Studies Press. ISBN 9781894865531.
- Kulchytsky, Stalislav (1 October 2004). "Demohrafichni vtraty Ukrayiny v khkh stolitti" Демографічні втрати України в хх столітті [Demographic losses in Ukrainian in the twentieth century]. Dzerkalo Tyzhnia (in Ukrainian).
- Kulchytsky, Stanislav (25 October 2005). "Why did Stalin exterminate the Ukrainians? Comprehending the Holodomor. The position of Soviet historians – Six-part series". Den. No. 33–39. Archived from the original on 27 September 2007 – via Orange Revolution website.

Original online issues for series:

"Part 1". Den. No. 33. 25 October 2005. Archived from the original on 27 June 2022. "(Kulchytsky 2005)"
"Part 2". Den. No. 34. 1 November 2005. Archived from the original on 20 August 2022. "(Kulchytsky 2005)"
"Part 3". Den. No. 35. 8 November 2005. Archived from the original on 31 October 2022. "(Kulchytsky 2005)"
"Part 4". Den. No. 37. 22 November 2005. Archived from the original on 31 October 2022. "(Kulchytsky 2005)"
"Part 5". Den. No. 38. 29 November 2005. Archived from the original on 27 June 2022. "(Kulchytsky 2005)"
"Part 6". Den. No. 39. 6 December 2005. Archived from the original on 27 June 2022. "(Kulchytsky 2005)"

- Kulchytsky, Stanislav (24 November 2006). "Holodomor-33: chomu i yak?" Голодомор-33: чому і як? [Holodomor-33: Why and how?]. Dzerkalo Tyzhnia (in Ukrainian) (25).
- Kulchytsky, Stanislav [in Ukrainian] (13 February 2007). "Holodomor of 1932–33 as genocide: gaps in the evidential basis Part 1 of 4". Den. No. 5. Archived from the original on 2 March 2022. "Part 2, Part 3, Part 4."
- Kulchytsky, Stanislav [in Ukrainian] (27 February 2007). "Holodomor of 1932–33 as genocide: gaps in the evidential basis Part 2". Den. No. 7. Archived from the original on 2 March 2022.
- Kulchytsky, Stanislav [in Ukrainian] (6 March 2007). "Holodomor of 1932–33 as genocide: gaps in the evidential basis Part 3". Den. No. 8. Archived from the original on 1 May 2022.
- Kulchytsky, Stanislav [in Ukrainian] (20 March 2007). "Holodomor of 1932–33 as genocide: gaps in the evidential basis Part 4". Den. No. 9. Archived from the original on 27 June 2022.
- Kulchytsky, Stanislav [in Ukrainian] (17 February 2007). "Holodomor 1932–1933 rr. yak henotsyd: prohalyny u dokazovii bazi" Голодомор 1932 — 1933 рр. як геноцид: прогалини у доказовій базі [Holodomor 1932–1933 as genocide: gaps in the evidence]. Den (in Ukrainian). Archived from the original on 2 December 2020. (English article Archived 1 May 2022 at the Wayback Machine)
- Kulchytsky, Stanislav [in Ukrainian] (2008). Holod 1932-1933 pp. v Ukrayini yak henotsyd: movoyu dokumentiv, ochyma svidkiv гoлoд 1932-1933 pp. в Україні як геноцид: мовою документів, очима свідків [Famine 1932-1933 pp. in Ukraine as genocide: in the language of documents, through the eyes of witnesses] (PDF) (in Ukrainian). Archived (PDF) from the original on 21 May 2023.
- Kulchytsky, Stanislav [in Ukrainian] (September 2017). "The Ukrainian Holodomor against the Background of the Communist Onslaught, 1929–1938" (PDF). Holodomor Research and Education Consortium. Translated by Kinsella, Ali; Olynyk, Marta D. Archived from the original (PDF) on 11 January 2021.
- Kulchytsky, Stanislav [in Ukrainian] (27 November 2020). "Chomu vidbuvsya Holodomor - Stanislav Kulʹchytsʹkyy" Чому відбувся Голодомор - Станіслав Кульчицький [Why did the Holodomor happen - Stanislav Kulchytsky] (in Ukrainian). Archived from the original on 2 December 2021.
- Kuśnierz, Robert (21 November 2013). Post-holodomor Population Resettlements to Ukraine (1933–1934). 45th Annual Convention of the Association for Slavic, East European and Eurasian Studies. Boston. Archived from the original on 9 January 2016.
- Kuśnierz, Robert (10 April 2018). "Przesiedlenia ludności na Ukrainie w latach 1933–1934" [Resettlement of population in Ukraine in the years 1933–1934]. Dzieje Najnowsze (in Polish). 50 (1): 51–68. doi:10.12775/DN.2018.1.03.
- Kyiv Post (30 October 2010). "Harper accused of exaggerating Ukrainian genocide death toll". KyivPost. MontrealGazette.com, Kyiv Post. Archived from the original on 14 March 2022.
- Liber, George. Total wars and the making of modern Ukraine, 1914–1954 ( U of Toronto Press, 2016).
- Lemkin, Raphael (2008) [1953]. "Soviet Genocide in the Ukraine" ( (PDF)). In Luciuk, Lubomyr; Grekul, Lisa (eds.). Holodomor: Reflections on the Great Famine of 1932–1933 in Soviet Ukraine. Kashtan Press. ISBN 978-1-896354-33-0. Archived from the original on 2 March 2012.
- Lemkin, Raphael (26 November 2010). "Holodomor buv henotsydom. Tak vvazhav avtor terminu "henotsyd"" Голодомор був геноцидом. Так вважав автор терміну "геноцид" [Holodomor was a genocide, according to the author of the term]. Історична правда (in Ukrainian). Archived from the original on 24 January 2011.
- Leonavičius, Vylius; Ozolinčiūtė, Eglė (1 December 2019). "The Transformation of the Soviet Agriculture". Sociologija: Mintis Ir Veiksmas. 44 (1): 93–131. doi:10.15388/SocMintVei.2019.1.10. S2CID 213399789.
- Levy, Clifford J. (16 March 2009). "A New View of a Famine That Killed Millions". The New York Times. Archived from the original on 4 August 2022.
- Rossoliński-Liebe, Grzegorz (2016). "Holocaust Amnesia: The Ukrainian Diaspora and the Genocide of the Jews". In Schlemmer, Thomas; Steinweis, Alan E. (eds.). Holocaust and Memory in Europe. Berlin, Boston: De Gruyter. pp. 107–144. ISBN 978-1-896354-33-0.
- Lister, Tim; Fylyppov, Sanyo (5 May 2022). "Russians steal vast amounts of Ukrainian grain and equipment, threatening this year's harvest". CNN. Archived from the original on 18 June 2022.
- Loroff, Nicole; Vincent, Jordan; Kuryliw, Valentina (2015). "Holodomor – Denial and Silences: The Cover-Up: Denials, Dismissals and Silences". HREC Education [Holodomor Research and Education Consortium]. Canadian Institute of Ukrainian Studies. Archived from the original on 14 February 2022.
- Mace, James (1986). "The man-made famine of 1933 in Soviet Ukraine". In Serbyn, Roman; Krawchenko, Bohdan (eds.). Famine in Ukraine in 1932–1933. Canada: Canadian Institute of Ukrainian Studies. ISBN 978-0-09-286243-4.
- Mace, James E. (2004). "Soviet Man-Made Famine in Ukraine". In Totten, Samuel; Parsons, William S.; Charny, Israel W. (eds.). Century of Genocide: Critical Essays and Eyewitness Accounts. London: Routledge. pp. 93–126. ISBN 978-0-415-94430-4.
- Mace, James E. (2008). Ваші мертві вибрали мене ... [Your dead chose me ...]. Kyiv: Vyd-vo ZAT "Ukraïns'ka pres-hrupa". ISBN 978-966-8152-13-9. (A collection of Mace's articles and columns published in Den from 1993 to 2004).
- Maksudov, Sergei (1981). "Losses Suffered by the Population of the USSR 1918–1958". In Medvedev, Roy A. (ed.). The Samizdat Register II. London–New York: W. W. Norton & Company. ISBN 978-0-393-01419-8.
- Margolis, Eric (16 November 2003). "Seven million died in the 'forgotten' holocaust". ukemonde.com. Archived from the original on 9 September 2017. "First appeared in Toronto Sun, 16Nov2003"
- Makuch, Andrij. "The famine of 1932–1933". Encyclopædia Britannica online. Archived from the original on 23 November 2015.
- Malko, Victoria A. (2021). The Ukrainian Intelligentsia and Genocide: The Struggle for History, Language, and Culture in the 1920s and 1930s. Lexington Books. ISBN 978-1-4985-9679-4. Archived from the original on 19 December 2023.
- Markevich, Andrei; Naumenko, Natalya; Qian, Nancy (July 2021). The Causes of Ukrainian Famine Mortality, 1932–33 (CEPR Discussion Paper No. DP16408). doi:10.3386/w29089.
- Marples, David R. (14 July 2002). "Analysis: Debating the undebatable? Ukraine Famine of 1932–1933". The Ukrainian Weekly. Vol. LXX, no. 28. Archived from the original on 12 November 2020.
- Marples, David (30 November 2005). "The great famine debate goes on ..." ExpressNews, University of Alberta. Archived from the original on 15 June 2008 – via originally published in the Edmonton Journal.
- Marples, David R. (1 January 2007). Heroes and Villains: Creating National History in Contemporary Ukraine. Central European University Press. ISBN 978-963-7326-98-1. Archived from the original on 19 December 2023 – via Google Books.
- Marples, David R. (1 May 2009). "Ethnic Issues in the Famine of 1932–1933 in Ukraine". Europe-Asia Studies. 61 (3): 505–518. doi:10.1080/09668130902753325. ISSN 0966-8136. S2CID 67783643.
- Martin, Terry (2001). The Affirmative Action Empire: Nations and Nationalism in the Soviet Union, 1923–1939 (paperback ed.). Ithaca, New York: Cornell University Press. pp. 306–307. ISBN 978-0-8014-8677-7. Archived from the original on 24 April 2023 – via Google Books.
- McDaniels, Andrea K. (7 November 2015). "Organizers, including Timonium man, hope to educate with Ukrainian memorial in D.C." The Baltimore Sun. Archived from the original on 17 November 2015.
- Meier, Michael (1 October 2022). "Why Did So Many Ukrainians Die in the Soviet Great Famine?". Kellogg Insight. Archived from the original on 30 November 2022.
- Mendel, Iuliia (24 November 2018). "85 Years Later, Ukraine Marks Famine That Killed Millions". The New York Times. Gale A563244157. Archived from the original on 2 July 2022.
- Meslé, France; Pison, Gilles; Vallin, Jacques (June 2005). "France-Ukraine: Demographic Twins Separated by History". Population & Societies (413): 1–4. ProQuest 198225762. Archived from the original on 13 July 2022.
- Meslé, France; Vallin, Jacques (2003). Mortalité et causes de décès en Ukraine au XXe siècle [Mortality and causes of death in Ukraine in the 20th century] (in French) (CDROM ed.). Paris: Institut national d'études démographiques: Centre de démographie et d'écologie humaine de Moscou : Institut national des problèmes de sécurité internationale. Archived from the original on 9 January 2016.
- Musiienko, Oleksa H. (18 February 1988). "Hromadians'ka pozytsiia literatury i perebudova" Громадянська позиція літературі і перебудова [The Civic Position of Literature and Perestroika]. Literaturna Ukraïna (in Ukrainian): 7–8.
- Naimark, Norman M. (2010). Stalin's Genocides (Human Rights and Crimes against Humanity). Princeton, NJ: Princeton University Press. ISBN 978-0-691-14784-0. Archived from the original on 19 December 2023.
- Nalyvayko, Severyn; Bulanenko, Iryna (27 November 2016). "Historian Martyniuk: Ukrainian homes were massively occupied by Russian settlers". Euromaidan Press. Translated by Chraibi, Christine. Archived from the original on 13 December 2019.
- National Museum of the Holodomor (26 November 2018). "Museum History". Memorial Ukraine [to the Victims of the Holodomor]. Kyiv. Archived from the original on 17 February 2013.
- National Museum of the Holodomor (18 October 2019). "Worldwide Recognition of the Holodomor as Genocide". National Museum of the Holodomor-Genocide. Archived from the original on 29 March 2023.
- New Voice - UA (20 October 2022). "Russia removes Holodomor memorial in Mariupol". The New Voice of Ukraine. Archived from the original on 21 October 2022.
- Naumenko, Natalya (March 2021). "The Political Economy of Famine: The Ukrainian Famine of 1933". The Journal of Economic History. 81 (1): 156–197. doi:10.1017/S0022050720000625. ISSN 0022-0507.
- Noack, Christian; Janssen, Lindsay; Comerford, Vincent, eds. (October 2014). Holodomor and Gorta Mór: Histories, Memories and Representations of Famine in Ukraine and Ireland. Anthem Press. ISBN 978-1-78308-319-0.
- Obama, Barack (13 November 2009). "Statement by the President on the Ukrainian Holodomor Remembrance Day". whitehouse.gov. Archived from the original on 16 February 2017 – via National Archives.
- Obama administration- NSC Spokesman (20 November 2010). "Statement by the National Security Council Spokesman Mike Hammer on Ukraine's Holodomor Remembrance Day". whitehouse.gov. Archived from the original on 16 February 2017 – via National Archives.
- Obama administration- Office of the Press Secretary (19 November 2011). "Statement by the Press Secretary on Ukrainian Holodomor Remembrance Day". whitehouse.gov. Archived from the original on 16 February 2017 – via National Archives.
- Ohayon, Isabelle (13 January 2016). "The Kazakh Famine: The Beginnings of Sedentarization". Archived from the original on 29 May 2019.
- O'Neil, Peter (30 October 2010). "Harper accused of exaggerating Ukrainian genocide death toll". Ottawa Citizen. Archived from the original on 14 March 2022 – via Pressreader.com.
- Osadchenko, E. V.; Rudneva, S. E. (2012). "Golod na kubani 1932-1933 GG" Голод на кубани 1932-1933 ГГ [Famine in the Kuban 1932-1933]. Успехи современного естествознания [Advances in current natural sciences] (in Russian) (1): 96–98. ISSN 1681-7494. Archived from the original on 14 March 2022. "На Кубани только за период с ноября 1932 г. по весну 1933 г. число задокументированных жертв голода составило 62 тысячи человек. По мнению большинства историков, реальная цифра погибших в разы больше." [In the Kuban, only for the period from November 1932 to the spring of 1933, the number of documented victims of famine amounted to 62 thousand people. According to most historians, the real death toll is many times higher.]
- Papakin, Heorhii (27 November 2010). ""Chorni doshky" Holodomoru – ekonomichnyi metod znyshchennia hromadian URSR (SPYSOK)" "Чорні дошки" Голодомору - економічний метод знищення громадян УРСР (СПИСОК) ["Black boards" of the Holodomor: An economic method for the destruction of community members of the Ukrainian SSR (list)]. Istorychna Pravda (in Ukrainian). Archived from the original on 3 January 2019.
- Pianigiani, Gaia (23 November 2022). "Pope Francis compares Russia's war against Ukraine to a devastating Stalin-era famine". The New York Times. ISSN 0362-4331. Archived from the original on 25 November 2022.
- Pipes, Richard (1995). Russia Under the Bolshevik Regime. New York: Vintage Books. ISBN 978-0-679-76184-6.
- Potocki, Robert (2003). Polityka państwa polskiego wobec zagadnienia ukraińskiego w latach 1930–1939 [The policy of the Polish state towards the Ukrainian question in the years 1930–1939] (in Polish and English). Lublin: Instytut Europy Środkowo-Wschodniej. ISBN 978-83-917615-4-0.
- Qian, Nancy (2021). "The Political Economic Causes of the Soviet Great Famine, 1932-1933". CEPR & VideoVox Economics (Webinar). Political Economy. Centre for Economic Policy Research. Archived from the original on 14 December 2022 – via YouTube.
- Rada (14 May 2003). "Pro Zvernennya do Ukrayinsʹkoho narodu uchasnykiv spetsialʹnoho zasidannya Verkhovnoyi Rady Ukrayiny 14 travnya 2003 roku shchodo vshanuvannya pam'yati zhertv holodomoru 1932–1933" Про Звернення до Українського народу учасників спеціального засідання Верховної Ради України 14 травня 2003 року щодо вшанування пам'яті жертв голодомору 1932–1933 [Address of the Verkhovna Rada to the Ukrainian nation on commemorating the victims of Holodomor 1932–1933]. Офіційний вебпортал парламенту України (in Ukrainian). Verkhovna Rada (Parliament of Ukraine). Archived from the original on 10 July 2022.
- Rada (28 November 2006). "ZAKON UKRAYINY: Pro Holodomor 1932–1933 rokiv v Ukrayini" ЗАКОН УКРАЇНИ: Про Голодомор 1932–1933 років в Україні [Law of Ukraine: About the Holodomor of 1932–1933 in Ukraine]. Офіційний вебпортал парламенту України (in Ukrainian). Verkhovna Rada (Parliament of Ukraine). Archived from the original on 3 May 2015.
- Rada (4 June 2007). "Pro vstanovlennya Dnya pam'yati zhertv holodomoriv" Про встановлення Дня пам'яті жертв голодоморів [On the establishment of the Holodomor Remembrance Day]. Офіційний вебпортал парламенту України (in Ukrainian). Verkhovna Rada (Parliament of Ukraine). Archived from the original on 19 December 2023.
- Radzinsky, Edvard (1996). Stalin: The First In-depth Biography Based on Explosive New Documents from Russia's Secret Archives. London: Hodder & Stoughton. ISBN 978-0-340-60619-3.
- Rating Group Ukraine (26 November 2021). "Dynamika stavlennya ukrayintsiv do holodomoru 1932–33" Динаміка ставлення українців до голодомору 1932–33 [Dynamics of the attitude of Ukrainians to the Holodomor of 1932–1933] (in Ukrainian). Archived from the original on 26 November 2021.
- Reid, Anna (7 October 2017). "Rule by Starvation". The Wall Street Journal. Archived from the original on 8 October 2017.
- Rosefielde, Steven (1983). "Excess Mortality in the Soviet Union: A Reconsideration of the Demographic Consequences of Forced Industrialization, 1929–1949". Soviet Studies. 35 (3): 385–409. doi:10.1080/09668138308411488. JSTOR 151363. PMID 11636006.
- Rud, Victor (21 November 2016). "Holodomor Remembrance Day: Why the Past Matters for the Future". Atlantic Council. Archived from the original on 1 December 2017.
- Rudnytskyi, Omelian P.; Levchuk, Nataliia M.; Wolowyna, Oleh; Shevchuk, Pavlo E.; Kovbasiuk, Alla B. (24 December 2015). "Demography оf a Man-Made Human Catastrophe: the Case of Massive Famine in Ukraine 1932–1933" (PDF). Demography and Social Economy (3): 43–63. doi:10.15407/dse2015.03.003. Archived (PDF) from the original on 13 August 2022.
- Rusanivsʹkyĭ, Vitaliĭ M., ed. (2010). "Zamoryuvaty" Заморювати [To Freeze]. Academic explanatory dictionary of the Ukrainian language (in Ukrainian). Наукова думка and Sum.in.ua. ISBN 978-966-02-7402-0. Archived from the original on 29 August 2022.
- Samchuk, U. (1952). Maria. A Chronicle of a Life. Toronto: Language Lantern Publications. Archived from the original on 25 March 2017.
- Santora, Marc; Vinograd, Cassandra (26 November 2022). "On the Anniversary of Ukraine's Famine, Parallels to Russia's Strikes". The New York Times. ISSN 0362-4331. Archived from the original on 22 December 2022.
- Selden, Mark (September 1982). "The Crisis of Collectivisation: Socialist Development and the Peasantry". The IDS Bulletin. 13 (4): 4–11. doi:10.1111/j.1759-5436.1982.mp13004002.x.
- Serbyn, Roman (2005). "Ukraine (Famine)". In Shelton, Dinah L. (ed.). Encyclopedia of Genocide and Crimes Against Humanity. Vol. 3. Detroit, MI: Thomson Gale. pp. 1055–1061. ISBN 0-02-865847-7. OCLC 470301730.
- Serbyn, Roman (27 February 2008). "The Ukrainian Famine of 1932–1933 and the UN Convention on Genocide". Kharkiv Human Rights Protection Group. Archived from the original on 13 July 2022.
- Serbyn, Roman (9 May 2015). "Role of Lemkin". HREC Education [Holodomor Research and Education Consortium]. Canadian Institute of Ukrainian Studies. Archived from the original on 30 May 2019.
- Shaw, George Bernard; Wells, H. G.; Keynes, John Maynard; Stalin, Joseph (1934). Stalin-Wells-talk: The Verbatim Record and a Discussion. London: The New Statesman and Nation. OCLC 1185552369.
- Sheeter, Laura (24 November 2007). "Ukraine remembers famine horror". BBC News. Archived from the original on 31 July 2012.
- Shevchenko University news (2016). "Mizhnarodna konferentsiya "Holodomor 1932–1933 rokiv: vtraty ukrayinsʹkoyi natsiyi"" Міжнародна конференція "Голодомор 1932–1933 років: втрати української нації" [International Conference "The Holodomor of 1932–1933: the losses of the Ukrainian nation"] (in Ukrainian). Taras Shevchenko National University of Kyiv. Archived from the original on 3 July 2023.
- Snyder, Timothy (25 June 2009). "Holocaust: The ignored reality". Eurozine. Archived from the original on 28 July 2017.
- Snyder, Timothy (2010). Bloodlands: Europe Between Hitler and Stalin. New York: Basic Books. ISBN 978-0-465-00239-9.
- Sokur, Vasily (21 November 2008). "Vyyavlennym vo vremya golodomora lyudoyedam khodivshiye po selam meditsinskiye rabotniki davali otravlennyye "primanki" – kusok myasa ili khleba" Выявленным во время голодомора людоедам ходившие по селам медицинские работники давали отравленные "приманки" – кусок мяса или хлеба [Cannibals identified during the Holodomor were given poisoned "baits" by medical workers walking around the villages – a piece of meat or bread]. Facts and Commentaries (in Russian). Archived from the original on 20 January 2013. "The author suggests that never in the history of mankind was cannibalism so widespread as during the Holodomor."
- Soldatenko, Valerii (2003). "Holodnyy trydtsyatʹ tretiy sub'yektyvni dumky pro ob'yektyvni protsesy" Голодний тридцять третій суб'єктивні думки про об'єктивні процеси [The starvation of '33: subjective thoughts about objective processes]. Dzerkalo Tyzhnia (in Ukrainian and Russian) (24, 28 June – 4 July). Kyiv.
- Sosnovy, Stepan (1953). "The Truth about the Famine". In Pidhainy, Semen O. (ed.). The Black Deeds of the Kremlin: A White Book. Volume 1: Testimonials (pdf). Vol. 1. Translated by Oreletsky, Alexander; Prychodko, Olga. Toronto: The Basilian Press, for Ukrainian Association of Victims of Russian Communist Terror. p. 222. ASIN B000EGMA4O. Archived (PDF) from the original on 28 November 2022.
- Stewart, Daniel (24 November 2022). "Irish Senate recognizes Ukrainian genocide in the 1930s". News 360. MSN. Archived from the original on 25 November 2022.
- Suny, Ronald Grigor (2017). Red Flag Unfurled: History, Historians, and the Russian Revolution. Verso Books. pp. 94–95. ISBN 978-1-78478-564-2. "Most scholars rejected this claim, seeing the famine as following from a badly conceived and miscalculated policy of excessive requisitioning of grain, but not as directed specifically against ethnic Ukrainians."
- Tauger, Mark B. (Spring 1991). "The 1932 Harvest and the Famine of 1933". Slavic Review. 50 (1): 70–89. doi:10.2307/2500600. JSTOR 2500600. S2CID 163767073.
- Tauger, Mark B. (January 2001). Chase, William; Donnorummo, Bob; Linden, Ronald H. (eds.). "Natural Disaster and Human Actions in the Soviet Famine of 1931–1933" (PDF). The Carl Beck Papers in Russian and East European Studies (1506). University of Pittsburgh Center for International Studies: 67. doi:10.5195/CBP.2001.89. ISSN 0889-275X. Archived from the original (PDF) on 24 August 2012.
- Tehran Times (20 February 2021). ""Holodomor" reveals how Stalin starved millions in Ukrainian famine". Archived from the original on 22 February 2021.
- Thevenin, Etienne (29 June 2005). France, Germany and Austria: Facing the famine of 1932–1933 in Ukraine (PDF). James Mace Memorial Panel, IAUS Congress, Donetsk, Ukraine. Archived from the original (PDF) on 14 March 2022.
- Totten, Samuel; Parsons, William S.; Charny, Israel W. (2004). Century of Genocide: Critical Essays and Eyewitness Accounts. Routledge. p. 93. ISBN 978-0-415-94429-8.
- Ucrainica Research (2009). "International Recognition of the Holodomor". Holodomor Education. Archived from the original on 31 December 2015.
- Ukraine National Bank (17 December 2007). "Commemorative Coins "Holodomor – Genocide of the Ukrainian People". Archived from the original on 8 January 2008.
- Ukraine National Radio (23 November 2007). "Ceremonial events to commemorate Holodomor victims to be held in Kyiv for three days". Archived from the original on 16 February 2011.
- Ukrainian Weekly (14 July 2002). "Editorial: Famine denial" (PDF). The Ukrainian Weekly. 70 (28): 6. Archived (PDF) from the original on 3 December 2013.
- Ukrainian Weekly (16 November 2003). "30 U.N. member-states sign joint declaration on Great Famine" (PDF). The Ukrainian Weekly. 71 (46): 1, 20. Archived (PDF) from the original on 3 March 2014.
- UN signatory nations (7 November 2003). Joint statement by the delegations of Azerbaijan, Bangladesh, Belarus, Benin, Bosnia and Herzegovina, Canada, Egypt, Georgia, Guatemala, Jamaica, Kazakhstan, Mongolia, Nauru, Pakistan, Qatar, the Republic of Moldova, the Russian Federation, Saudi Arabia, the Sudan, the Syrian Arab Republic, Tajikistan, Timor-Leste, Ukraine, the United Arab Emirates and the United States of America on the 70th anniversary of the Great Famine of 1932-1933 in Ukraine (Holodomor). Archived from the original on 3 January 2021.
- Ukrainian Canadian Congress (2008). "Holodomor". Ucc.sk.ca. Archived from the original on 5 March 2016.
- Ukrainian Canadian Congress (3 June 2010). "Quebec Passes Bill Recognizing Holodomor as a Genocide". Archived from the original on 12 February 2013.
- Ukrainian Canadian Congress (26 June 2020). "National Holodomor Education Committee". Archived from the original on 16 March 2022.
- Ukrinform (23 November 2022a). "Pope honors victims of Holodomor, aggression against Ukraine". Archived from the original on 23 November 2022.
- Ukrinform (25 November 2022d). "Poll: 93% of Ukrainians see Holodomor as genocide". Archived from the original on 25 November 2022.
- Ukrinform (15 December 2022e). "European Parliament recognizes Holodomor as genocide against Ukrainian people". Archived from the original on 15 December 2022.
- U.S. Commission on the Ukraine Famine (1988). Mace, James Earnest; Samilenko, Olga; Pechenuk, Walter (eds.). Investigation of the Ukrainian Famine 1932–1933 Vol.1:Report to Congress. Vol. 1 of 3. Washington, D.C.: United States Government Printing Office. p. 67. Archived from the original on 7 January 2007.
- U.S. Commission on the Ukraine Famine (1990). Mace, James Earnest; Heretz, Leonid (eds.). Investigation of the Ukrainian famine, 1932–1933: Oral History Project of the Commission on the Ukraine Famine. Vol. 1–3. U.S. Government Printing Office. Archived from the original on 8 April 2023.

Volume 1. U.S. Government Printing Office. 1990. Archived from the original on 8 April 2023 – via Google Books. "(US Commission- Oral History)"
Volume 2. U.S. Government Printing Office. 1990. Archived from the original on 8 April 2023 – via Google Books. "(US Commission- Oral History)"
Volume 3. U.S. Government Printing Office. 1990. Archived from the original on 24 April 2023 – via Google Books. "(US Commission- Oral History)"

- USSR Census (1939). "USSR Census of 1939". University of Toronto Data Library Service. Archived from the original on 6 July 2011.
- Uytkroft, S. (2001). "O demograficheskikh svidetel'stvakh tragedii sovetskoy derevni v 1931–1933 gg." О демографических свидетельствах трагедии советской деревни в 1931–1933 гг. [On demographic evidence of the tragedy of the Soviet village in 1931–1933]. In V.P. Danilov; et al. (eds.). Tragediya sovetskoy derevni: Kollektivizatsiya i raskulachivaniye 1927–1939 gg.: Dokumenty i materialy Трагедия советской деревни: Коллективизация и раскулачивание 1927–1939 гг.: Документы и материалы [The Tragedy of the Soviet Village: Collectivization and Dekulakization 1927–39: Documents and Materials] (in Russian). Vol. 3. Moscow: ROSSPEN. ISBN 978-5-8243-0225-7. Archived from the original on 20 March 2008.
- Vallin, Jacques; Meslé, France; Adamets, Serguei; Pyrozhkov, Serhii (January 2002). "A new estimate of Ukrainian population losses during the crises of the 1930s and 1940s". Population Studies. 56 (3): 249–264. doi:10.1080/00324720215934. PMID 12553326. S2CID 21128795.
- Van Herpen, Marcel (2013). Putinism: The Slow Rise of a Radical Right Regime in Russia. Palgrave Macmillan UK. ISBN 978-1-137-28282-8. Archived from the original on 19 December 2023.
- Velychko, Zoriana; Sotnyk, Roman (2024). "Linguistic Presentation and Terminological Aspects of the Holodomor of the 1920s and 1930s". Вісник Львівського університету. Серія журналістика [Journal of Lviv University. Journalism Series] (in Ukrainian) (54–55): 249–254. doi:10.30970/vjo.2024.54-55.12166.
- Viola, Lynne (1999). Peasant Rebels Under Stalin (E-book ed.). Oxford, England: Oxford University Press. p. 49. ISBN 978-0-19-535132-3. Archived from the original on 22 April 2022 – via Google Books.
- Visnyk (Summer 2008). "Saskatchewan first province to recognize Holodomor as genocide" (PDF). Visnyk (Весник). Vol. XXII, no. 2. Archived (PDF) from the original on 14 July 2014.
- Werth, Nicolas (1999). "A State against Its People: Violence, Repression, and Terror in the Soviet Union". In Courtois, Stéphane (ed.). The Black Book of Communism: Crimes, Terror, Repression. Translated by Kraemer, Mark; Murphy, Jonathan (illustrated hardcover ed.). Cambridge, Massachusetts: Harvard University Press. ISBN 978-0-674-07608-2.
- Werth, Nicolas (2007). "La grande famine ukrainienne de 1932–1933" [The Great Ukrainian Famine of 1932–1933]. In Werth, Nicolas (ed.). La terreur et le désarroi: Staline et son système [Terror and disarray: Stalin and his system edited] (in French). Paris: Perrin. ISBN 978-2-262-02462-8.
- Werth, Nicolas (18 April 2008). "The Great Ukrainian Famine of 1932-33". Sciences Po. Archived from the original on 3 January 2023.
- Werth, Nicolas (2012). "Mass Deportations, Ethnic Cleansing, and Genocidal Politics in the Later Russian Empire and the USSR". In Bloxham, Donald; Moses, A. Dirk (eds.). The Oxford Handbook of Genocide Studies. Oxford University Press. pp. 386–406. doi:10.1093/oxfordhb/9780199232116.013.0020. ISBN 978-0-19-161361-6. Archived from the original on 13 July 2022 – via Google Books.
- Wheatcroft, Stephen G. (7 December 2000). A Note on Demographic Data as an Indicator of the Tragedy of the Soviet Village, 1931–33 (draft) (PDF). Archived from the original (PDF) on 2 July 2013.
- Wheatcroft, Stephen G. (2001). "Current knowledge of the level and nature of mortality in the Ukrainian famine of 1931–3" ( (PDF)). In Vasil'ev, V.; Shapovala, Y. (eds.). Komandiri velikogo golodu: Poizdki V.Molotova I L.Kaganovicha v Ukrainu ta na Pivnichnii Kavkaz, 1932–1933 rr. Kyiv: Geneza. Archived from the original on 12 July 2021.
- Wheatcroft, Stephen G. (2018). "The Turn Away from Economic Explanations for Soviet Famines". Contemporary European History. 27 (3): 465–469. doi:10.1017/S0960777318000358. hdl:10536/DRO/DU:30116832.
- Wilson, Andrew (2002). The Ukrainians: Unexpected Nation (2nd ed.). New Haven, CT: Yale University Press. ISBN 978-0-300-09309-4. Archived from the original on 19 December 2023.
- Wolowyna, Oleh (2 October 2021). "A Demographic Framework for the 1932–1934 Famine in the Soviet Union". Journal of Genocide Research. 23 (4): 501–526. doi:10.1080/14623528.2020.1834741. S2CID 226316468.
- Yanchenko, Halyna (2 December 2022). "Bundestah vyznav Holodomor henotsydom ukrayintsiv. Chomu stalysya tsi zminy u nimetsʹkiy politytsi?" Бундестаг визнав Голодомор геноцидом українців. Чому сталися ці зміни у німецькій політиці? [The Bundestag recognized the Holodomor as a genocide of Ukrainians. Why did these changes in German politics happen?]. Ukrainska Pravda (in Ukrainian). Archived from the original on 23 December 2022.
- Yefimenko, Hennadiy (5 November 2021). "More is not better. The deleterious effects of artificially inflated Holodomor death tolls". Euromaidan Press. Translated by Chraibi, Christine. Archived from the original on 1 May 2022.
- Yushchenko, Viktor (6 April 2005). "Ukrainian President Yushchenko: Yushchenko's Address before Joint Session of U.S. Congress". Official Website of President of Ukraine. Archived from the original on 6 October 2006.
- Yushchenko, Viktor (12 October 2006). "UKAZ Prezydenta Ukrayiny № 868/2006: Pro vidznachennya u 2006 rotsi Dnya pam'yati zhertv holodomoriv ta politychnykh represiy" УКАЗ Президента України № 868/2006: Про відзначення у 2006 році Дня пам'яті жертв голодоморів та політичних репресій [DECREE OF THE PRESIDENT OF UKRAINE No. 868/2006: On the commemoration of the Day of Remembrance of the Victims of Famine and Political Repression in 2006] (in Ukrainian). Office of the President of Ukraine. Archived from the original on 28 September 2007.
- Yushchenko, Viktor (27 November 2007). "Holodomor". The Wall Street Journal. Archived from the original on 8 September 2008.
- Zaxid (27 November 2020). "Vykhovannya holodom" Виховання голодом [Education by hunger]. Zaxid.net (in Ukrainian). Archived from the original on 9 December 2020.
- ZIK (information agency) (12 June 2009). "Schoolchildren to study in detail about Holodomor and OUN-UPA". ZIK–Western Information Agency. Archived from the original on 22 April 2012.
