= Outline of the Holodomor =

Overview of and topical guide to the Holodomor

Outline of the Holodomor Голодомор
- Starved peasants on a street in Kharkiv, 1933, Ukraine's capital at the time
- Country: Soviet Union
- Location: Ukraine SSR, northern Kuban, Kazakh ASSR
- Period: 1932–1933
- Total deaths: Around 3.5 to 5 million in Ukraine; see death toll; 62,000 to "hundreds of thousands" in the Kuban; Over 300,000 Ukrainians in Kazakhstan dead or migrated
- Causes: Industrialization policy during the first five year plan; Dekulakization; Soviet collectivization of farming; Intentional starvation of Ukrainians (disputed)
- Relief: Foreign relief rejected by the state. 176,200 and 325,000 tons of grains provided by the state as food and seed aids between February and July 1933.
- Consequences: Heavy population loss in Ukraine; Kuban Ukrainian population declined from 915,000 to 150,000 between 1926 and 1939 from various causes; Population of Ukrainians in Kazakhstan shrunk by more than one third

The following outline is provided as an overview of and topical guide to the Holodomor. (Note: Holodomor (Голодомор) is a Ukrainian compound of holod, "hunger", and mor, "plague". In English it is usually rendered as "death by hunger" or "killing by starvation".)

The Holodomor was a man-made famine in Soviet Ukraine from 1932 to 1933 that killed millions of Ukrainians and is widely recognized as a genocide. It was part of the Soviet famine of 1930–1933, that affected the major grain-producing areas of the Soviet Union.

== Main articles ==
- Bibliography of the Holodomor
- Blacklisting (Soviet policy)
- Causes of the Holodomor
- Collectivization in the Soviet Union
- Collectivization in the Ukrainian Soviet Socialist Republic
- Dekulakization
- First five-year plan (Soviet Union)
- Gulag
- Holodomor
- Holodomor genocide question
- Joint State Political Directorate
- Kolkhoz
- Kulak
- Law of Spikelets

== Soviet officials ==
- Vsevolod Balitsky
- Vlas Chubar
- Lazar Kaganovich
- Mendel Khatayevich
- Stanisław Kosior
- Vyacheslav Molotov
- Grigory Petrovsky
- Pavel Postyshev
- Stanislav Redens
- Joseph Stalin

== Locations ==
- Baturyn
- Borzna
- Hlybochytsia
- Katerynivka, Donetsk Oblast
- Kuban
- Machine tractor station
- Orikhiv
- Sedniv
- Ukrainian Soviet Socialist Republic

== Aftermath ==
- Great Purge
- Holodomor denial
- Holodomor in modern politics
- International Commission of Inquiry Into the 1932–1933 Famine in Ukraine
- Raphael Lemkin
- United States Commission on the Ukraine Famine

== Related topics ==
- 1930 Temporary Anglo-Soviet Commercial Agreement
- Executed Renaissance
- Human cannibalism
- Passport system in the Soviet Union
- Torgsin
- Ukrainization

== Historiography and memory ==
=== Historians ===
- Anne Applebaum
- Robert Conquest
- Valentina Kuryliw
- James Mace
- David R. Marples
- Mykola Shytyuk
- Timothy Snyder

=== Memorials ===
- Holodomor Genocide Memorial
- Holodomor Memorial Day
- List of Holodomor memorials and monuments
- National Museum of the Holodomor-Genocide

=== Literature ===
- Bloodlands
- The Harvest of Sorrow
- Holodomor: The Unknown Ukrainian Tragedy (1932–1933)
- Red Famine
- The Yellow Prince

=== Films ===
- Bitter Harvest (2017 film)
- Famine-33
- The Guide (film)
- Holodomor: Voices of Survivors
- Mr. Jones (2019 film)
- The Soviet Story

== Bibliography ==
- Applebaum, A. (2017). Red famine: Stalin's war on Ukraine. Doubleday.
- Conquest, R. (1986). The harvest of sorrow: Soviet collectivization and the terror-famine. Oxford University Press.
- Snyder, T. (2010). Bloodlands: Europe between Hitler and Stalin. Basic Books.

== See also ==
- 1921–1922 famine in Tatarstan
- Kazakh famine of 1919–1922
- Kazakh famine of 1930–1933
- Russian famine of 1921–1922
- Soviet famine of 1930–1933
- Soviet famine of 1946–1947
- Soviet famine of 1946–1947 in Ukraine
- Genocide
- Crimes against humanity
- Outline of Genocide studies
- Outline of the Armenian genocide
- Outline of the Cambodian genocide
- Outline of the Holocaust
