= Holodomor in modern politics =

Discourse and memorialization of the 1932–1933 Ukraine famine in politics

The Holodomor (Ukrainian: Голодомор, derived from Ukrainian: морити голодом, romanized: moryty holodom, lit. 'to kill by starvation') was a 1932–33 man-made famine in Soviet Ukraine and adjacent Ukrainian-inhabited territories that killed millions of Ukrainians. Opinions and beliefs about the Holodomor vary widely among nations. It is considered a genocide by Ukraine, and Ukraine's Ministry of Foreign Affairs has sought international recognition of the famine as a genocide. By 2022, the Holodomor was recognized as a genocide by the parliaments of 23 countries and the European Parliament, and it is recognized as a part of the Soviet famine of 1932–1933 by Russia. As of January 2025, 35 countries recognise the Holodomor as a genocide (last being Switzerland on September 24, 2024).

== Background ==
The classification of the Holodomor famine as a genocide has been controversial, a situation which was partially attributed to the objections of prominent Holocaust experts who took issue with the politicization of the term genocide. These experts emphasized the fact that there must be an "intent to destroy a whole group of people" and instead of using the word "genocide" as a descriptive term for the Holodomor, they used the term "mass extermination". Raphael Lemkin, who first coined genocide, was a featured speaker at a gathering of Ukrainian Americans which was held to commemorate the twentieth anniversary of the Ukrainian Famine in September 1953, describing the 1932–1933 famine as one aspect of a genocide in Ukraine perpetrated by the Soviet authorities between 1926 and 1946.

== Recognition ==
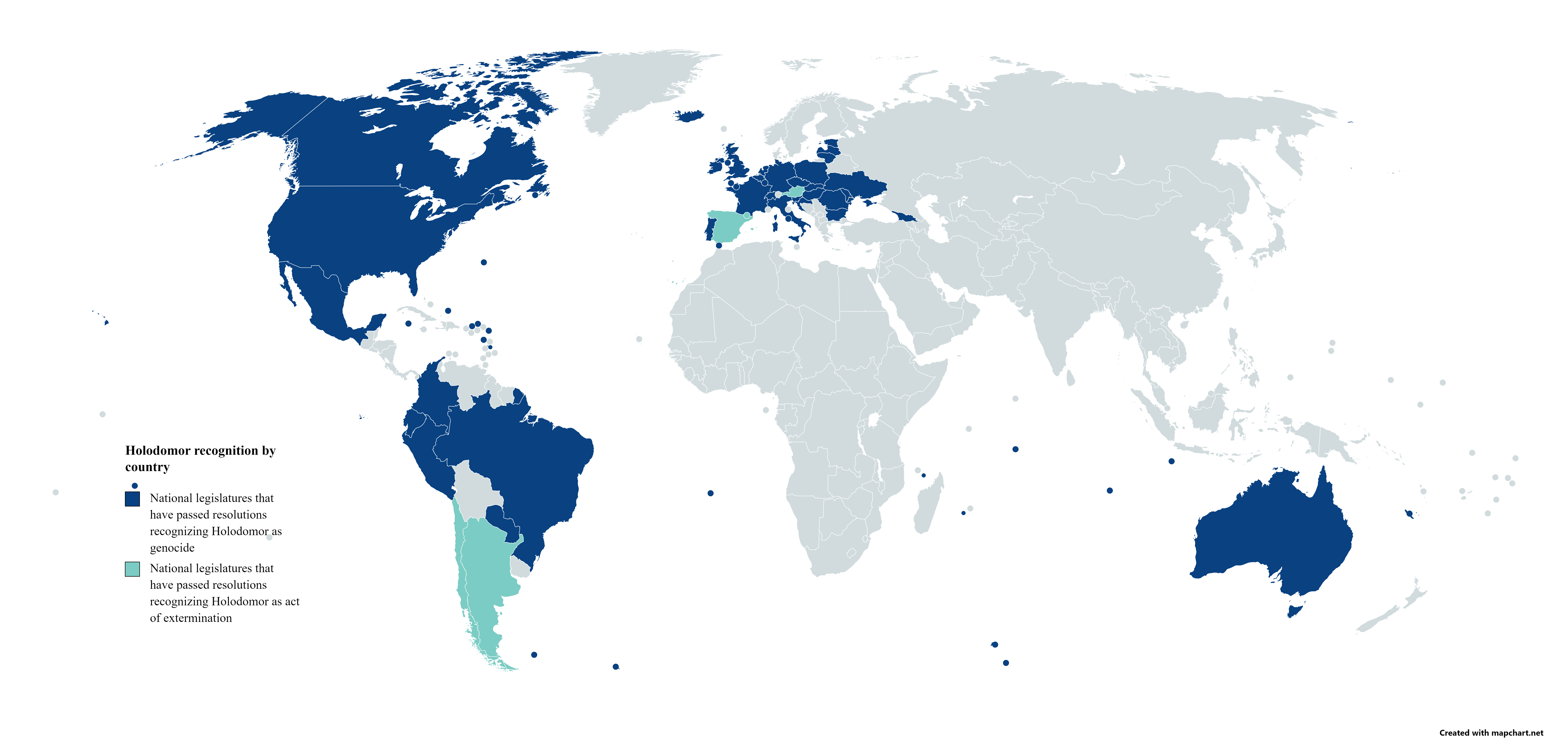
Recognition of the Holodomor by country

Ukraine's Ministry of Foreign Affairs has run campaigns and lobbied the United Nations and the Council of Europe to recognise the Holodomor as a genocide internationally. The governments of various countries have issued statements recognizing the Holodomor as genocide including Ukraine since 2006, and 13 other countries as of 2015.

In November 2022, the Belarusian opposition in exile recognised the Holodomor as a genocide, and Pope Francis compared the Russian war in Ukraine with its targeted destruction of civilian infrastructure to the "terrible Holodomor Genocide", during an address at St. Peter's Square. As of January 2026, 34 countries recognise the Holodomor as a genocide.

Countries whose legislatures have passed a resolution recognizing the Holodomor as a genocide:

- Australia, 28 October 1993
- Belgium, 10 March 2023
- Bulgaria, 1 February 2023
- Canada, 20 June 2003
- Colombia, 21 December 2007
- Croatia, moved 15 June 2023, approved 28 June 2023
- Czech Republic, 6 April 2022
- Ecuador, 30 October 2007
- Estonia, 20 October 1993
- France, 28 March 2023
- Georgia, 20 December 2005
- Germany, 30 November 2022
- Hungary, 26 November 2003
- Iceland, 22 March 2023
- Italy, 26 July 2023
- Latvia, 13 March 2008
- Lithuania, 24 November 2005
- Luxembourg, 13 June 2023
- Mexico, 19 February 2008
- Moldova, 24 November 2022
- Netherlands, 7 July 2023
- Paraguay, 25 October 2007
- Peru, 19 June 2007
- Poland, 4 December 2006
- Portugal, 2 March 2017
- Romania, 24 November 2022
- Slovakia, 20 June 2023
- Slovenia, 23 May 2023
- Switzerland, 24 September 2024
- Ukraine, 28 November 2006
- United Kingdom, 25 May 2023 (resolution passed by the House of Commons)
  - Wales, 25 October 2023
- United States, 11 December 2018 (resolution passed by the House of Representatives; on 4 October 2018 resolution passed by the Senate)

Countries whose legislatures have partially passed a resolution recognizing the Holodomor as a genocide:

- Brazil, 26 April 2022 (resolution passed by the Federal Senate)
- Ireland, 24 November 2022 (resolution passed by the Seanad)

Countries whose parliamentary factions have issued joint declarations recognizing the Holodomor as a genocide:

- Finland, 24 November 2023 (joint declaration by all parliamentary faction leaders due to the lack of a procedural mechanism for historical resolutions)

Other political bodies whose legislatures have passed a resolution recognizing Holodomor as a genocide:

- European Union, 15 December 2022
- Council of Europe, 12 October 2023
- Chechen Republic of Ichkeria (government in exile), 26 November 2022

Other countries that have issued official documents describing the Holodomor as genocide:

- Vatican City, 2 April 2004

Many countries have signed declarations in statements at the United Nations General Assembly affirming that the Holodomor was as a "national tragedy of the Ukrainian people" caused by the "cruel actions and policies of the totalitarian regime". (Note: See the United Nations for a list of resolutions with references.) Similar statements were passed as resolutions by international organizations (Note: See United Nations section for details and references.) such as the European Parliament, (Note: See European Parliament section for text and references for European Parliament resolution of 23 October 2008 on the commemoration of the Holodomor, the Ukraine artificial famine.) the Parliamentary Assembly of the Council of Europe (PACE), (Note: See Council of Europe for details and references.) the Organization for Security and Cooperation in Europe (OSCE), and the United Nations Organization for Education, Science and Culture (UNESCO).

Countries to have signed declarations for the United Nations on the Holodomor (Note: For details on recognition, see National recognition.) (Note: Referenced are a list of nations which were co-author sponsors of the United Nations Declaration on 85th anniversary of Holodomor.) include Albania, (Note: Nation has signed the United Nations Declaration on the Eighty-Fifth Anniversary of the Holodomor of 1932-1933 in Ukraine.) Argentina, Australia, Austria, Azerbaijan, Belgium, Bulgaria, Canada, Chile, Colombia, Czechia, Croatia, Denmark, Ecuador, Estonia, Finland, France, Georgia, Hungary, Iceland, Ireland, Israel, Latvia, Liechtenstein, Lithuania, Luxembourg, Mexico, Moldova, Monaco, Montenegro, Paraguay, Peru, Poland, Portugal, Slovakia, Spain, Ukraine, and the United States.

=== National recognition ===
==== Ukraine ====
During most of the Soviet period, the famine of 1932–1933 was a taboo topic in Soviet Ukraine. Following a series of events, such as the publication in 1986 of Robert Conquest's The Harvest of Sorrow, the broadcasting into Ukraine of its reading aloud on Radio Liberty, the 1988 report of the U.S. Commission on the Ukraine Famine, and the influence of the new Soviet policy of glasnost, it became acceptable to publicly broach the subject of the famine. Ukrainian Communist Party head Volodymyr Shcherbytsky gave state and party scholars access to official archives and tasked them with discrediting the allegations of an artificial cause for the famine. Unexpectedly, the Soviet committee's report concluded that the famine was not a fraud. The Ukrainian Communist Party passed a resolution blaming the "criminal course pursued by Stalin and his closest entourage".

On 15 May 2003, the Ukrainian parliament also passed a resolution declaring the famine to be an act of genocide deliberately organized by the Soviet government against the Ukrainians. On 28 November 2006, the parliament passed a resolution recognizing the Holodomor as an act of genocide against the "Ukrainian people" and making public Holodomor denial illegal. Supporting the bill were BYuT (118 deputies), NSNU (79), Socialists (30), 4 independent deputies, and the Party of Regions (2). Opposing the bill were KPU. 200 deputies did not cast a vote. In all, 233 deputies supported the bill, which was more than the minimum of 226 votes required to pass it into law. Implementing the bill required amendments to the criminal code which were never enacted.

In 2007, Ukrainian president Viktor Yushchenko declared he wanted "a new law criminalising Holodomor denial", including the designation of the Holodomor as genocide or not, but such a law has never been adopted. KPU head Petro Symonenko accused Yushchenko of "using the famine to stir up hatred" and stated he "does not believe there was any deliberate starvation at all".

On 12 January 2010, the court of appeals in Kyiv opened hearings into the "fact of genocide-famine Holodomor in Ukraine in 1932–33". In May 2009, the Security Service of Ukraine started a criminal case "in relation to the genocide in Ukraine in 1932–33". In a ruling of 13 January 2010, Kyiv's court of appeal recognized "the leaders of the totalitarian Bolshevik regime as those guilty of 'genocide against the Ukrainian national group in 1932–33 through the artificial creation of living conditions intended for its partial physical destruction.'" The court dropped criminal proceedings against leaders such as Joseph Stalin, Vyacheslav Molotov, Lazar Kaganovich, Stanislav Kosior, Pavel Postyshev, Vlas Chubar, and others who all had died years before. This decision became effective on 21 January 2010.

==== Australia ====
Resolution #680 was adopted by the Australian Senate on 30 October 2003, stating:

The Senate

- a) Notes that 2003 is the 70th anniversary of the enforced Famine in the Ukraine caused by the deliberate actions of Stalin's communist government of the Union of Soviet Socialist Republics;
- b) Recalls that an estimated 7 million Ukrainians starved to death as a result of Stalinist policies in 1932–33 alone, and that millions more lost their lives in the purge that ensued for the remainder of the decade;
- c) Notes that this constitutes one of the most heinous acts of genocide in history;

On 22 February 2008, the Australian House of Representatives issued a statement on the 75th Anniversary of Ukrainian Famine, which stated:

75th Anniversary of the Ukrainian Famine That the House:

- (1) notes that 2007 marks the 75th anniversary of the Great Ukrainian Famine—Holodomor of 1932–33, caused by the deliberate actions of Stalin's communist Government of the Union of Soviet Socialist Republics;
- (2) recalls that an estimated 7 million Ukrainians starved to death as a result of Stalinist policies in 1932–33 alone, and that millions more lost their lives in the purge that ensued for the remainder of the decade;
- (3) notes: (a) that this constitutes one of the most heinous acts of genocide in history; (b) that the Ukrainian Famine was one of the greatest losses of human life in one country in the 20th century; and (c) that it remains insufficiently known and acknowledged by the world community and the United Nations as an act of genocide against the Ukrainian nation and its people, but has been recognised as such by the Verkhovna Rada (Parliament of Ukraine); (4) honours the memory of those who lost their lives; (5) joins the Ukrainian people throughout the world, and particularly in Australia, in commemorating these tragic events; and (6) submits that the Australian Government support a resolution to the General Assembly of the United Nations, which may be submitted by the Government of Ukraine, that the Holodomor in Ukraine in 1932–33 be recognised as an act of genocide against the Ukrainian nation and its people.

==== Canada ====
The Holodomor has been recognized by the prime minister of Canada, the Senate of Canada, and the House of Commons of Canada. With the advice and consent of the Senate and House of Commons, the government of Canada has declared that the fourth Saturday in November be known the Ukrainian Famine and Genocide (Holodomor) Memorial Day. The Senate unanimously adopted a motion on the recognition of the Holodomor as a "Famine-Genocide" in 2003, for Canada "to condemn any attempt to deny or distort this historical truth as anything less than a genocide", (Note: Bold type was used in the official press release from the Canadian Senate regarding the passing of the resolution on the Famine Genocide.) and called for a day of remembrance for "those that perished during the time of the Ukrainian Famine Genocide" to be commemorated on the fourth Saturday of November, (Note: The fourth Saturday of November is the day the Ukraine remembers the Holodomor.) and for historians, educators, and parliamentarians "to include the true facts of the Ukrainian Famine/Genocide of 1932–33 in the records of Canada and in future educational materials". The day of remembrance was adopted in 2008.

With the concurrence of the Canadian Senate, the House of Commons passed "An act to establish a Ukrainian Famine and Genocide ('Holodomor') Memorial Day and to recognize the Ukrainian Famine of 1932–33 as an act of genocide", in part stating:

Whereas the Ukrainian Famine and Genocide of 1932-33 known as the Holodomor was deliberately planned and executed by the Soviet regime under Joseph Stalin to systematically destroy the Ukrainian people's aspirations for a free and independent Ukraine, and subsequently caused the death of millions of Ukrainians in 1932 and 1933. ... Her Majesty, by and with the advice and consent of the Senate and House of Commons of Canada, enacts as follows: 1. This Act may be cited as the Ukrainian Famine and Genocide ("Holodomor") Memorial Day Act. 2. Throughout Canada, in each and every year, the fourth Saturday in November shall be known as "Ukrainian Famine and Genocide ("Holodomor") Memorial Day".

Canada has also signed all four of the joint declarations by delegations at the United Nations General Assembly recognizing and condemning the Holodomor. (Note: See footnotes and references in the United Nations section.) In 2019, an official statement about the genocide was issued from the prime minister Justin Trudeau on Holodomor Memorial Day, in part reading:

Today, we remember the millions of innocent people in Ukraine who suffered and died during the Holodomor. From 1932 to 1933, the totalitarian Soviet regime launched a campaign of starvation across Ukraine. Millions died, and countless others were arrested, deported, or executed in a genocide designed to break their will. In the face of these horrors, the people of Ukraine endured, protecting their language, their culture, and their identity. In 1991, after decades of Soviet rule and oppression, they gained their independence. For too many years, the perpetrators of the Holodomor denied its existence and hid the full extent of the unspeakable suffering from the international community. It falls to each one of us to ensure their stories are never erased.

Saskatchewan, Manitoba, Alberta, Ontario, and Quebec have also passed legislation recognizing the Holodomor similar to those on the national level. The Legislative Assembly of Saskatchewan recognized the Holodomor as genocide in 2008 with the passage of The Ukrainian Famine and Genocide (Holodomor) Memorial Day Act. In 2019, the Saskatchewan legislature lit a memorial candle for the duration of Holodomor Memorial Week to commemorate and remember the victims of the famine genocide. A statue titled "Bitter Memories of Childhood" was installed in the park grounds surrounding the Saskatchewan Legislative Building in 2015 to remember the victims of the Holodomor. After attending the candle lighting ceremony in the legislature, Canadian minister Greg Ottenbreit laid a wreath at the statue.

==== Colombia ====
The Chamber of Representatives of Colombia passed Resolution 079 in December 2007 recognizing the Holodomor as an act of genocide against the Ukrainian people. The resolution's goal was to "condemn the Genocide, which became the cause of 7 million victims among children, women, men and elderly people." (Note: English translation of text from the Holodomor Museum.)

==== Italy ====
At the international conference of the Ukrainian Holodomor, which was held in October 2003 at the Institute of Social and Religious History of Vicenza, 28 conference participants that included historians James Mace, Hubert Laszkiewicz, Andrea Graziosi, Yuriy Shapoval, Gerhard Simon, Orest Subtelny, and Mauro Martini endorsed a resolution addressed to the Italian government and the European Parliament with a request to recognize the Holodomor as an act of genocide against the Ukrainian people.

==== Russian Federation ====
The Russian Federation officially says that the Holodomor is not a genocide. The State Duma passed a resolution in 2008 stating that the Holodomor should not be considered genocide, stating in part: "There is no historical proof that the famine was organized along ethnic lines. Its victims were millions of citizens of the Soviet Union, representing different peoples and nationalities living largely in agricultural areas of the country." The Russian government condemned the Soviet regime's "disregard for the lives of people in the attainment of economic and political goals", along with "any attempts to revive totalitarian regimes that disregard the rights and lives of citizens in former Soviet states", while stating that "there is no historic evidence that the famine was organized on ethnic grounds."

Russian politician Mikhail Kamynin said that Russia is against the politicisation of the Holodomor, and that this question is for historians, not politicians. The State Duma vice-speaker Lyubov Sliska, when asked in Kyiv when Russia would apologize for its part in repressions and famines in Ukraine, replied: "[W]hy always insist that Russia apologize for everything? The people whose policies brought suffering not only to Ukraine, but to Russia, Belarus, peoples of the Caucasus, and Crimean Tatars, remain only in history textbooks, secret documents and minutes of meetings." Ukrainian mass media censured Evgeny Guzeev, the Consul-General of the Russian Federation in Lviv, who stated that "the leaders of the period were sensible people, and it is impossible to imagine that this was planned." Kyiv Post believes that Russia contests the recognition of the famine as a genocide because "as the Soviet Union's legal successor, Russia is also concerned about the possibility of legal action or having to pay reparations."

On 17 November 2007, members from Aleksandr Dugin's Russian nationalist group the Eurasian Youth Union broke into the Ukrainian cultural center in Moscow and smashed an exhibition on the famine. A Moscow Times article reported the event thusly: "The Kremlin argues that genocide is the killing of a population based on their ethnicity, whereas Stalin's regime annihilated all kinds of people indiscriminately, regardless of their ethnicity. But if the Kremlin really believed in this argument, it would officially acknowledge that Stalin's actions constituted mass genocide against all the people of the Soviet Union."

==== United States ====
In 2006, the United States government authorized the building of the Holodomor Genocide Memorial in Washington, D.C. (Note: See 120 STAT. 1864 PUBLIC LAW 109–340—OCT. 13, 2006.) The United States Senate also adopted a non-binding resolution on 3 October 2018 recognising the Holodomor as genocide. The resolution reads that the Senate "recognizes the findings of the Commission on the Ukraine Famine as submitted to Congress on April 22, 1988, including that ... 'Stalin and those around him committed genocide against the Ukrainians in 1932–1933.'" As of January 2021, the Senate, the United States House of Representatives, and multiple state governments have recognized the famine as man-made and as an act of genocide.

The "Recognition and Denial of Genocide and Mass Killing in the 20th Century" conference held at City University of New York on 13 November 1987 concluded that millions died in Soviet Ukraine during a famine in 1932–1933 and that the famine was both man-made and widely known. The United States government commission investigating the famine concluded this was part of the central government's attack on Ukrainian nationality and culture. The United States received reports about the famine from diplomatic contacts in Europe. The conference concluded that political considerations regarding the establishment of diplomatic relations with the Soviet Union played a role in not publicly sharing the information. The conference also found that leading American journalists working in the Soviet Union knowingly distorted or omitted information about the famine.

===== United States Commission on the Ukraine Famine =====
According to the Commission on the Ukraine Famine, the famine was an act of genocide against the people of Ukraine committed by Stalin. The seizure of the 1932 crop by the Soviet authorities was the main reason for the famine. The commission stated that "while famine took place during the 1932–1933 agricultural year in the Volga Basin and the North Caucasus Territory as a whole, the invasiveness of Stalin's interventions of both the Fall of 1932 and January 1933 in Ukraine are paralleled only in the ethnically Ukrainian Kuban region of the North Caucasus."

===== Holodomor Genocide Memorial =====
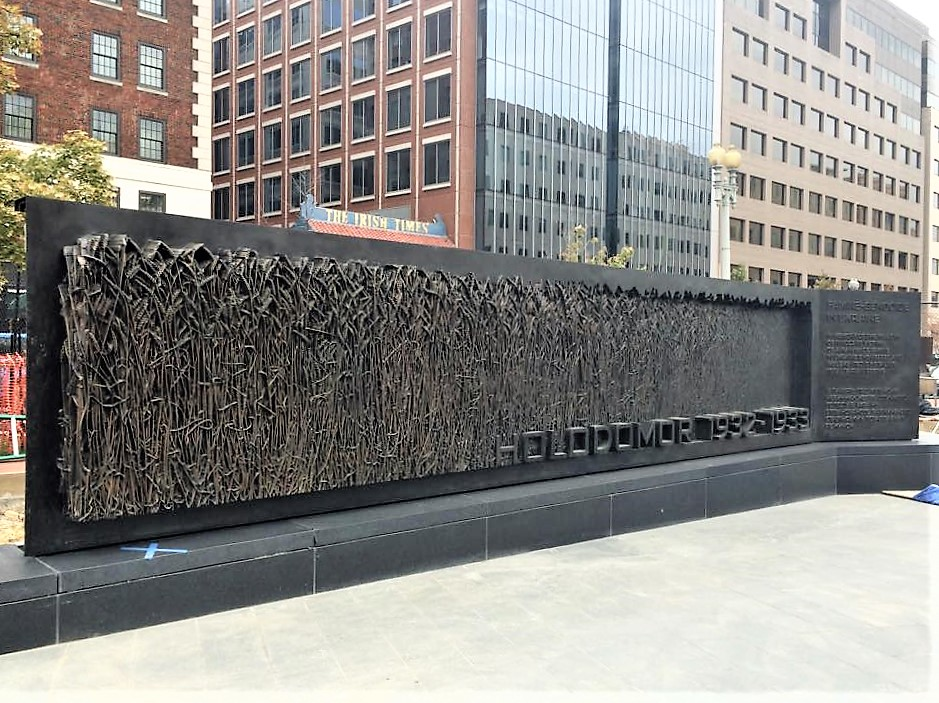
The Holodomor Genocide Memorial

In 2006, the United States government enacted Public Law 109-340 authorizing the establishment of a memorial to victims of the "famine-genocide". The law was passed by the 109th Congress and signed into law by President George W. Bush and states that "the Government of Ukraine is authorized to establish a memorial on Federal land in the District of Columbia to honor the victims of the Ukrainian famine-genocide of 1932–1933." On 7 November 2015, the Holodomor Genocide Memorial was opened in Washington, D.C. (Note: Referenced is further information about the design and opening of the memorial.)

Officially named The Holodomor Memorial to Victims of the Ukrainian Famine-Genocide of 1932–1933, the memorial is a joint project between the United States and the Ukrainian government, and is operated by the National Park Service. The inscription on the memorial reads: "Famine-Genocide in Ukraine. In memory of the millions of innocent victims of a man-made famine in Ukraine engineered and implemented by Stalin's totalitarian regime." (Note: Referenced is further information about the design and operation of the memorial.)

=== International recognition ===
==== United Nations ====
On 10 November 2003, the Ukrainian ambassador to the United Nations presented a joint declaration at the United Nations in connection with the 70th anniversary of the Great Famine in Ukraine 1932–1933 to the United Nations General Assembly. It was signed by 25 member delegations, and by the end of the month the list of signatories grew to 36, plus the European Union. The preamble stated:

In the former Soviet Union millions of men, women and children fell victims to the cruel actions and policies of the totalitarian regime. The Great Famine of 1932–1933 in Ukraine (Holodomor), took from 7 million to 10 million innocent lives and became a national tragedy for the Ukrainian people. In this regard, we note activities in observance of the seventieth anniversary of this Famine, in particular organized by the Government of Ukraine. Honouring the seventieth anniversary of the Ukrainian tragedy, we also commemorate the memory of millions of Russians, Kazakhs and representatives of other nationalities who died of starvation in the Volga River region, Northern Caucasus, Kazakhstan and in other parts of the former Soviet Union, as a result of civil war and forced collectivisation, leaving deep scars in the consciousness of future generations.

Valeriy P. Kuchinsky, the chief Ukrainian representative, said that the declaration that the Holodomor was a result of the totalitarian politics of the Soviet regime was a compromise between the position of the Ukrainian government to recognize the Holodomor as genocide, and the positions of the British, Russian, and United States governments to not. Subsequent declarations on significant anniversary dates have recalled the 2003 statement as well as the 2007 UNESCO resolution. The United Nations General Assembly has not recognized the Holodomor as a genocide. Many states signed one or more declarations presented in plenary sessions:

- 2003, 10 November: Joint statement on the seventieth anniversary of the Holodomor of 1932–1933 in Ukraine (signed by 36 UNGA members) (Note: Nations signing the Joint Statement on the Seventieth Anniversary of the Great Famine of 1932–1933 in Ukraine (Holodomor) included Azerbaijan, Bangladesh, Belarus, Benin, Bosnia and Herzegovina, Canada, Egypt, Georgia, Guatemala, Islamic Republic of Iran, Jamaica, Kazakhstan, Kuwait, Kyrgyzstan, Mongolia, Nauru, Nepal, Pakistan, Peru, Qatar, Saudi Arabia, South Africa, Tajikistan, the former Yugoslav Republic of Macedonia, the Republic of Korea, the Republic of Moldova, the Russian Federation, the Sudan, the Syrian Arab Republic, the United Arab Emirates, the United States of America, Timor-Leste, Turkmenistan, Ukraine, and Uzbekistan.)
- 2008, 16 December: Declaration on the seventy-fifth anniversary of the Holodomor of 1932–1933 in Ukraine (32 members) (Note: Nations signing the Declaration on the Seventy-Fifth Anniversary of the Holodomor of 1932–1933 in Ukraine included Albania, Australia, Austria, Azerbaijan, Belgium, Canada, Croatia, Czechia, Denmark, Estonia, Finland, France, Georgia, Germany, Hungary, Iceland, Ireland, Israel, Latvia, Liechtenstein, Lithuania, Luxemburg, Malta, Monaco, Norway, Poland, Saint Lucia, Spain, Sweden, Ukraine, the United Kingdom, and the United States.)
- 2013, 12 December: Joint statement on the eightieth anniversary of the Holodomor of 1932–1933 in Ukraine (32 members) (Note: Nations signing the Joint Statement on the Eightieth Anniversary of the Holodomor of 1932–1933 in Ukraine included Albania, Australia, Austria, Azerbaijan, Belgium, Canada, Croatia, Czechia, Denmark, Estonia, Finland, France, Georgia, Germany, Hungary, Iceland, Ireland, Israel, Latvia, Liechtenstein, Lithuania, Luxembourg, Malta, Moldova, Monaco, Norway, Poland, Spain, Sweden, Ukraine, the United Kingdom, and the United States.)
- 2018, 11 December: Declaration on the eighty-fifth anniversary of the Holodomor of 1932–1933 in Ukraine (38 members) (Note: Nations signing the Declaration on the Eighty-Fifth Anniversary of the Holodomor of 1932–1933 in Ukraine included Albania, Australia, Austria, Azerbaijan, Belgium, Bulgaria, Canada, Chile, Croatia, Czechia, Denmark, Estonia, Finland, France, Georgia, Germany, Hungary, Iceland, Ireland, Israel, Latvia, Liechtenstein, Lithuania, Luxembourg, Moldova, Monaco, Montenegro, the Netherlands, Norway, Poland, Portugal, Slovenia, Spain, Sweden, Switzerland, Ukraine, the United Kingdom, and the United States.)
- 2023, 24 November: declaration by 55 member states.

===== UNESCO =====
At the 2007 General Conference of the UNESCO, 193 member delegations unanimously passed a resolution "On Remembrance of Victims of the Great Famine (Holodomor) in Ukraine". The 1 November statement recalled the 2003 United Nations joint statement, expressed sympathy, welcomed, and encouraged members to participate in the upcoming 75th-anniversary commemorations, and requested the director-general to promote awareness of the Holodomor.

==== International Commission of Inquiry Into the 1932–1933 Famine in Ukraine ====
The final report of the International Commission of Inquiry Into the 1932–1933 Famine in Ukraine, initiated by the Ukrainian World Congress and delivered to the UN Under-Secretary for Human Rights in Geneva on May 9 and to the President of the Parliamentary Assembly of the Council of Europe on May 10, 1990, concluded that the famine in Ukraine was a genocide. At same time, the commission is unable to affirm the existence of a preconceived plan to organize a famine in Ukraine in order to ensure the success of Moscow policies; however, they concluded that Soviet authorities used the famine voluntarily, when it happened, "to crown they [sic] new policy of denationalization."

==== Baltic Assembly ====
In 2007, Estonia, Latvia, and Lithuania acting in the Baltic Assembly, issued the statement "On Commemorating the Victims of Genocide and Political Repressions Committed in Ukraine in 1932 and 1933", condemning the genocide and political repressions committed in 1932 and 1933. The statement read:

The Baltic Assembly,

- acknowledging that genocide and political repressions are crimes against humanity;
- condemning the genocide and political repressions committed in 1932 and 1933 as a result of which the Ukrainian people experienced mental and physical sufferings;
- emphasizing that the Baltic States truly understand the tragedy of the Ukrainian people because during World War II the Baltic States lost their independence, and hundreds of thousands of their permanent inhabitants were executed or deported to the remote and harsh regions of the Soviet Union;
- stressing the Baltic States' solidarity with the Ukrainian people, proposes raising public awareness, especially the awareness of the younger generation, about genocide and other crimes against humanity;
- expresses the deepest sympathy to the victims of genocide and political repressions, as well as to the entire Ukrainian people who have endured these sufferings.

Riga, 24 November 2007

==== EU-Ukraine Parliamentary Cooperation Committee ====
On 14 November 2013, the EU-Ukraine Parliamentary Cooperation Committee agreed on and issued a joint statement, which stated:

Commemorates with a sense of deep sorrow the victims of the 1932–1933 Holodomor in Ukraine and urges the EU Member States to condemn the criminal actions of the totalitarian USSR regime which orchestrated the Holodomor Ukrainian genocide and to commemorate the millions of victims of the Holodomor, particularly during formal events at the Eastern Partnership Summit in Vilnius on 28 and 29 November 2013.

==== Organization for Security and Co-operation in Europe ====
On 3 July 2008, the Parliamentary Assembly of the Organization for Security and Co-operation in Europe passed the resolution condemning the Ukrainian famine acknowledging the direct responsibility of the Soviet action. The resolution called upon all parliaments to take measures on recognition of the fact of Holodomor in Ukraine but fell short of recognizing it as an act of genocide as requested by the document prepared by the Ukrainian delegation.

==== European Parliament ====
On 23 October 2008, the European Parliament passed a resolution titled "European Parliament resolution of 23 October 2008 on the commemoration of the Holodomor, the Ukraine artificial famine (1932–1933)". The resolution included the following statements:

Whereas the Holodomor famine of 1932–1933, which caused the deaths of millions of Ukrainians, was cynically and cruelly planned by Stalin's regime in order to force through the Soviet Union's policy of collectivisation of agriculture against the will of the rural population in Ukraine. ... Makes the following declaration to the people of Ukraine and in particular to the remaining survivors of the Holodomor and the families and relatives of the victims:

- Recognises the Holodomor (the artificial famine of 1932–1933 in Ukraine) as an appalling crime against the Ukrainian people, and against humanity;
- Strongly condemns these acts, directed against the Ukrainian peasantry, and marked by mass annihilation and violations of human rights and freedoms;
- Expresses its sympathy with the Ukrainian people, who suffered in this tragedy, and pays its respects to those who died as a consequence of the artificial famine of 1932–1933;
- Calls on the countries which emerged following the break-up of the Soviet Union to open up their archives on the Holodomor in Ukraine of 1932–1933 to comprehensive scrutiny so that all the causes and consequences can be revealed and fully investigated;

==== Council of Europe ====
In 2010, the Parliamentary Assembly of the Council of Europe approved Resolution 1723 (2010), titled "Commemorating the victims of the Great Famine (Holodomor) in the former USSR", recognising and condemning the Holodomor as a crime against humanity. (Note: See Section 11, Resolution 1723, Council of Europe.) The resolution in part read:

Section 4: Millions of innocent people in Belarus, Kazakhstan, Moldova, Russia and Ukraine, which were parts of the Soviet Union, lost their lives as a result of mass starvation caused by the cruel and deliberate actions and policies of the Soviet regime.

Section 11: It strongly condemns the cruel policies pursued by the Stalinist regime, which resulted in the death of millions of innocent people, as a crime against humanity. It resolutely rejects any attempts to justify these deadly policies, by whatever purposes, and recalls that the right to life is non-derogable.

Resolution 1723 references Resolution 1481 (2006) on the need for international condemnation of the crimes committed by totalitarian communist regimes and recognising other groups that were impacted by the wider famine of 1932–1933.

== 2020s ==
Russia's war strategy in the war against Ukraine in 2022 has drawn parallels with the Holodomor for the intentional impediment of relief supplies to civilians, the blockade of Ukrainian ports that threatened to cause famine in other countries, and the deliberate targeting of civilian infrastructure to deprive Ukrainians of the necessities of life. As of early May 2022, Ukraine's Defense Ministry claims that Russian forces have plundered at least 500,000 tons of grain from farmers since the invasion started. This looting included the seizure of industrial farm equipment, such as tractors, and forcing farmers to surrender 70% of their grain yields. Russia's use of starvation as a weapon of war in 2022 has been cited as part of a genocidal pattern in a major report by 35 legal and genocide experts.

== See also ==
- Outline of the Holodomor
- Bibliography of the Holodomor
- Crimes against humanity under communist regimes
- Criticism of communist party rule
- Droughts and famines in Russia and the Soviet Union
- Excess mortality in the Soviet Union under Joseph Stalin
- Genocide denial
- Genocide recognition politics
- Genocide studies
- Kazakh famine of 1931–1933
- Mass killings under communist regimes
- Soviet famine of 1930–1933
