= Holodomor genocide question =

Question of whether the 1932–1933 Ukraine famine constituted genocide

The Holodomor, a 1932–1933 man-made famine, (Note: Researchers who state that the famine was unintentional and did not aim at genocide still agree that the famine was not caused by natural crop failure, and so use words like "man-made famine" and "organised famine" to emphasize this fact. Most researchers agree that the famine was caused by social factors and government policies.) killed 3.3–5 million ethnic Ukrainian people in the Ukrainian Soviet Socialist Republic (as part of the Soviet Union), included in a total of 5.5–8.7 million perished in the broader Soviet famine of 1930–1933. At least 3.3 million ethnic Ukrainians died as a result of the famine in the USSR. Scholars debate whether there was an intent to starve millions of Ukrainians to death or not.

While scholars are in consensus that the cause of the famine was man-made, the topic remains a significant issue in modern politics with historians disputing whether Soviet policies in the era constitute genocide. Specifically, scholarly debate of the question centres around whether or not the Holodomor was intentional and therefore constitutes a genocide under the Genocide Convention. Broadly speaking, Russian historians are generally of the opinion that the Holodomor did not constitute a genocide. Among Ukrainian historians the general opinion is that it did constitute a genocide. Western historians hold varying views. Most scholars who reject the argument that state policy in regard to the famine was genocidal do not absolve Joseph Stalin or the Soviet regime as a whole from guilt for the famine deaths and still view such policies as being ultimately criminal in nature.

Since 2006, the Ukrainian government has sought recognition of the Holodomor as a genocide, and, as of 2023, 34 countries and the European Union had recognised the Holodomor as a genocide.

== Scholarly positions ==
=== Raphael Lemkin ===
Raphael Lemkin, who coined the term "genocide" in the 1940s and initiated the Genocide Convention, wrote in 1953 that the destruction of the Ukrainian nation "is a classic example of the Soviet genocide, the longest and most extensive experiment in Russification, namely the extermination of the Ukrainian nation". Lemkin stated that it consisted of four steps:

1. Extermination of the Ukrainian national elite, "the brain of the nation", which took place in 1920, 1926 and 1930–1933.
2. Liquidation of the Ukrainian Autocephalous Orthodox Church, "the soul of the nation", which occurred between 1926 and 1932 and during which 10,000 of its priests were killed. Lemkin highlighted that before liquidation, the Church was offered the opportunity to join the Russian Patriarchate, which Lemkin argues "indicates that the only goal of this action was Russification."
3. Extermination of a significant part of the Ukrainian peasantry as "custodians of traditions, folklore and music, national language and literature, and the national spirit" (the Holodomor itself).
4. Populating the territory with other nationalities with intent of mixing Ukrainians with them, which would eventually lead to the dissolution of the Ukrainian nation.

=== Robert Conquest ===
In 1986, British historian Robert Conquest published The Harvest of Sorrow: Soviet Collectivisation and the Terror-Famine, dealing with the collectivization of agriculture in Ukraine and elsewhere in the Soviet Union under Stalin's direction in 1929–1931 and the resulting famine, in which millions of peasants died due to starvation, deportation to labor camps, and execution. In this book, Conquest supported the view that the famine was a planned act of genocide. According to historians Stephen Wheatcroft and R. W. Davies, "Conquest holds that Stalin wanted the famine ... and that the Ukrainian famine was deliberately inflicted for its own sake."

In a 2006 interview with Radio Free Europe/Radio Liberty, Conquest stated the Holodomor should be recognized as an attack on the Ukrainian people, but it should not be entirely blamed on Russian people. He said: "I don't think the word genocide as such is a very useful one. When I say if you want to use it you can, but it was invented for rather different purposes. I can see that the trouble is it implies that somebody, some other nation, or a large part of it were doing it, that the Nazis are more or less implicated, they are Germans. But I don't think this is true – it wasn't a Russian exercise, the attack on the Ukrainian people. But it was a definite attack on them as they were discriminated against as far as death went."

=== James Mace ===
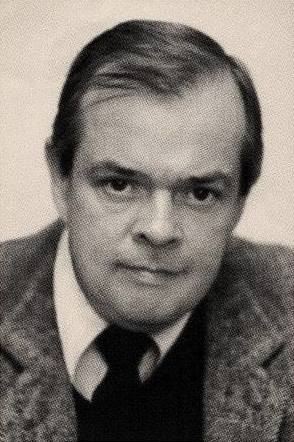
James Mace

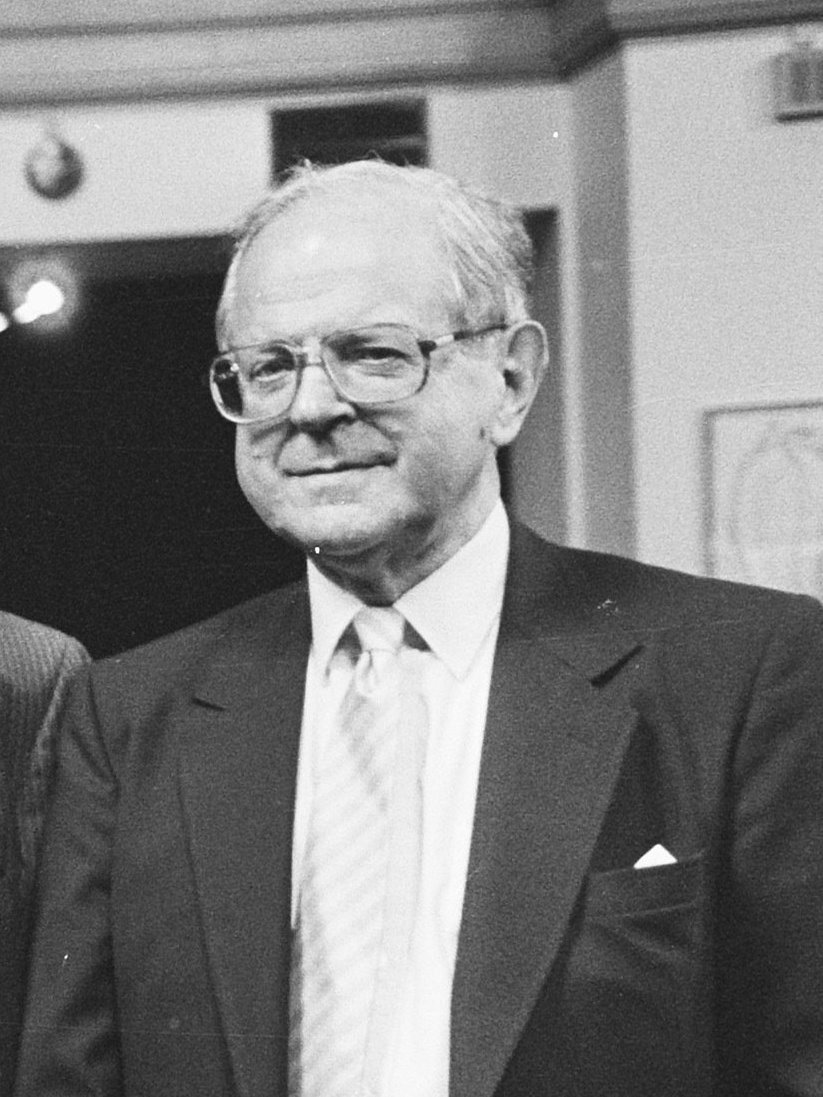
Robert Conquest in 1987

Professor of political science James Mace helped British historian Robert Conquest complete the book The Harvest of Sorrow, and after that he was the only U.S. historian working on the Ukrainian famine, and the first to categorically name it as a genocide. In his 1986 article "The man-made famine of 1933 in Soviet Ukraine", Mace wrote:

For the Ukrainians the famine must be understood as the most terrible part of a consistent policy carried out against them: the destruction of their cultural and spiritual elite which began with the trial of the Union for the Liberation of Ukraine, the destruction of the official Ukrainian wing of the Communist Party, and the destruction of their social basis in the countryside. Against them the famine seems to have been designed as part of a campaign to destroy them as a political factor and as a social organism.

Mace, staff director for the U.S. Commission on the Ukraine Famine, compiled a 1988 Report to Congress, he stated that, based on anecdotal evidence, the Soviets had purposely prevented Ukrainians from leaving famine-struck regions; this was later confirmed by the discovery of Stalin's January 1933 secret decree "Preventing the Mass Exodus of Peasants who are Starving", restricting travel by peasants after "in the Kuban and Ukraine a massive outflow of peasants 'for bread' has begun", that "like the outflow from Ukraine last year, was organized by the enemies of Soviet power." Roman Serbyn called this document one of the "smoking gun" revelations about the genocide. One of the nineteen main conclusions of the Report to Congress was that "Joseph Stalin and those around him committed genocide against Ukrainians in 1932–1933."

In his paper named "Is Ukrainian Genocide A Myth?", Mace further argued the Holodomor constituted a genocide. Among proof he cited a letter written by Stalin to Lazar Kaganovich on 11 September 1932, shortly before Kaganovich and Vyacheslav Molotov were appointed heads of special commissions to oversee the grain procurements in Ukraine and Kuban (a region considered to be populated primarily by ethnic Ukrainians at the time), in which Stalin urged Kaganovich to force Ukraine into absolute compliance.

=== Terry Martin ===
Terry Martin, Harvard Professor of Russian Studies, has written against the genocidal interpretation of the famine. In his influential 2001 monograph on Soviet nationalities policy, The Affirmative Action Empire, Martin writes:

No grain producing regions escaped the 1932-1933 grain requisitions terror entirely ... nationality was of minimal importance in this campaign. The famine was not an intentional act of genocide specifically targeting the Ukrainian nation. It is equally false, however, to assert that nationality played no role whatsoever in the famine.

Martin instead argues that the suffering experienced in Ukraine was exacerbated by an official 'national interpretation' of the 1932–1933 famine, wherein the Soviet state interpreted numerous events in the region as a hostile resurgence of Ukrainian nationalism, led by nationalists who had infiltrated the party and directed sympathetic policy towards the peasantry. Per Martin, grain requisition terror was directed indiscriminately in the "grain-producing regions of Ukraine, the North Caucasus, and the Lower Volga" against Russian and non-Russian peasants alike, but the fear of Ukrainian nationalists coloured the government's implementation of terror, resulting in greater excess mortality in the region than would have otherwise occurred. Intense resistance to collectivization in Ukraine was attributed by the state to botched implementation of Ukrainization, the promotion of Ukrainian language and culture. Martin singles out the Politburo decree of 14 December 1932, which condemned the "mechanical" implementation of Ukrainization and authorised additional terror against Ukrainian educational and cultural centres in Ukraine and Kuban. However Martin notes that while Ukrainization was paused during this period, it restarted after the famine, albeit at a more lowkey tempo.

=== John Archibald Getty ===
Historian John Archibald Getty wrote a critique of The Harvest of Sorrow and of Robert Conquest's claim that the famine constituted a genocide. In this critique, Getty states that the conclusion of the famine being engineered is a tempting one but that it is poorly supported by the evidence. While Getty writes that the conclusion of genocide requires a highly stretched interpretation of the evidence, he also states that Stalin was nonetheless the entity most responsible for the disaster. Getty cites Stalin's role as the prime backer of both hardline collectivisation and excessive demands on the peasantry.

Getty calls into question the estimate of the death toll at around five million Ukrainians presented in The Harvest of Sorrow as being much too high, citing much lower demographic estimates from Stephen Wheatcroft, Barbara Anderson, and Brian Silver, and notes that the severity of the famine varied greatly between local regions of Ukraine. Getty additionally says that the book fails to provide a convincing motive for genocide, and that other explanations for the famine better fit the evidence than the intentional genocide thesis. Getty points to the fact that Stalin's power was not absolute during these years of his rule, and that he had limited de facto control over local bureaucrats, with many of the Kremlin's orders regarding collectivisation during this time being subverted or ignored at lower levels of the chain of command; in some regions, local bureaucrats exceeded Stalin's demands for expropriation of kulaks, whereas in others, Stalin's demands for expropriation were disregarded and contravened.

Moreover, even Stalin's own plans during this time period were frequently unclear and subject to constant change, furthering confusion among the lower bureaucracy and the peasantry. In some districts, farms were collectivised, then decollectivised, and then collectivised yet again within the span of less than a year. Getty also attributes the failure of Soviet authorities to relieve the famine, once they realised it was going on, to Stalin's paranoia and chaotic decision-making. Getty writes that Stalin's reaction to the famine between 1932 and 1933 resembles his reaction to the 1941 German invasion of the Soviet Union in Operation Barbarossa. In Getty's view, both situations are marked by the delays by the central government to adequately respond to the crisis. Getty believes these delays stemmed from Stalin's intense distrust even of his own advisors rather than a calculated, deliberate effort to prolong the crises.

=== Mark Tauger ===
Mark Tauger, associate professor of history at West Virginia University, stated that the 1932 harvest was 30–40% smaller than recorded in official statistics. He stated that it is difficult to accept the famine "as the result of the 1932 grain procurements and as a conscious act of genocide" but that "the regime was still responsible for the deprivation and suffering of the Soviet population in the early 1930s", and "if anything, these data show that the effects of [collectivization and forced industrialization] were worse than has been assumed."

Davies and Wheatcroft criticized Tauger's methodology in the 2004 edition of The Years of Hunger. Tauger criticized Davies and Wheatcroft's methodology in a 2006 article. In the 2009 edition of their book, Davies and Wheatcroft apologized for "an error in our calculations of the 1932 [grain] yield" and stated grain yield was "between 55 and 60 million tons, a low harvest, but substantially higher than Tauger's 50 million." While they disagree on the exact tonnage of the harvest, they reach a similar conclusion as Tauger in their book's most recent edition and state that "there were two bad harvests in 1931 and 1932, largely but not wholly a result of natural conditions [...] obvious fact that the famine was also to a considerable extent a result of the previous actions of Stalin and the Soviet leadership", and "in our own work we, like V. P. Kozlov, have found no evidence that the Soviet authorities undertook a programme of genocide against Ukraine. ... We do not think it appropriate to describe the unintended consequences of a policy as 'organised' by the policy-makers."

In a 2002 article for The Ukrainian Weekly, David R. Marples criticized Tauger's choice of rejecting state figures in favour of those from collective farms, which had an incentive to underestimate harvests, and he argued that Tauger's conclusion is incorrect because in his view "there is no such thing as a 'natural' famine, no matter the size of the harvest. A famine requires some form of state or human input." Marples criticized Tauger and other scholars for failing "to distinguish between shortages, droughts and outright famine", commenting that people died in the millions in Ukraine but not in Russia because "the 'massive program of rationing and relief' was selective".

=== Andrea Graziosi ===
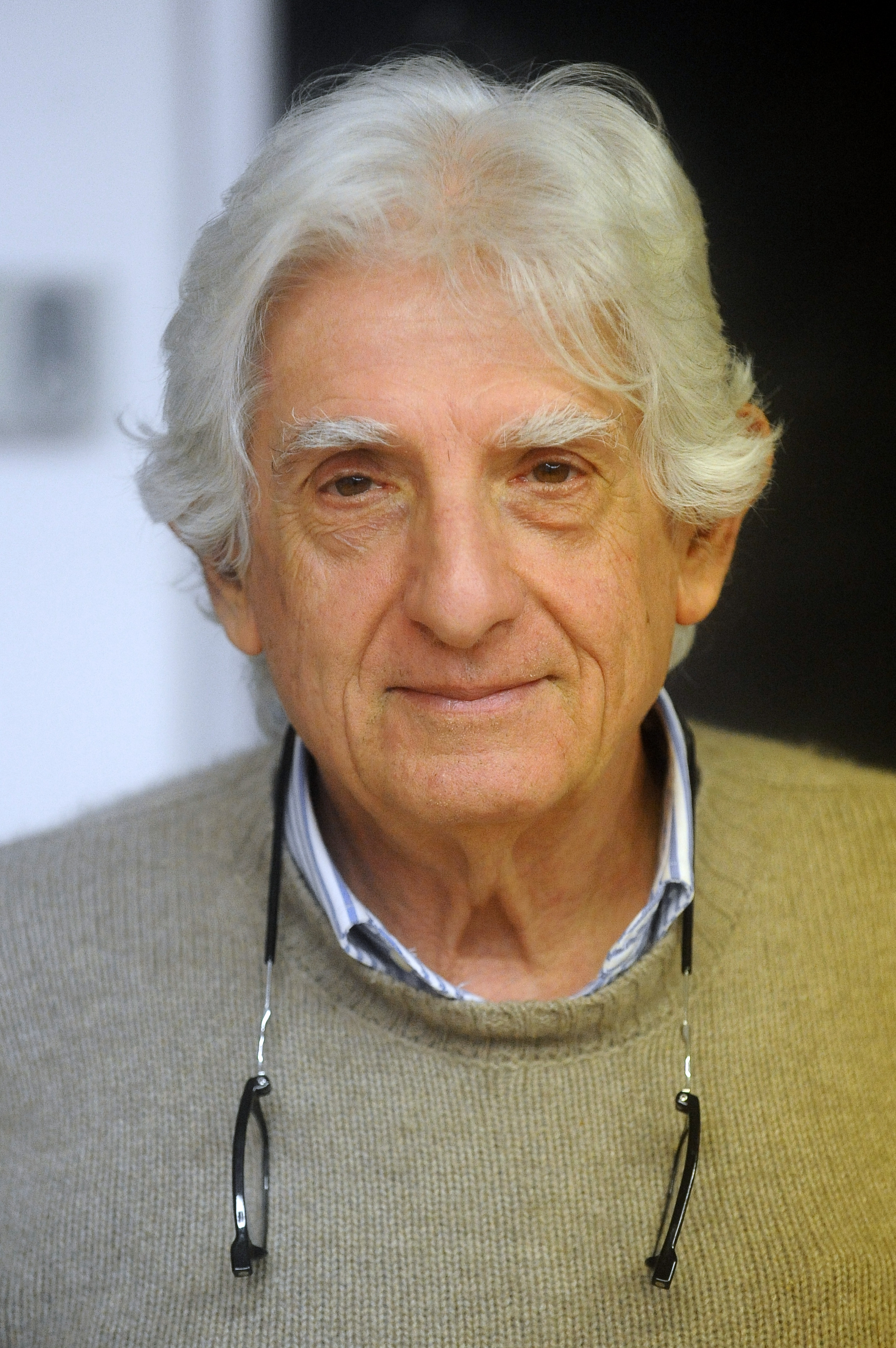
Andrea Graziosi in 2024 at the University of Trento

According to Italian historian and professor Andrea Graziosi, the Holodomor constituted a genocide, and was "the first genocide that was methodically planned out and perpetrated by depriving the very people who were producers of food of their nourishment". In his work, Graziosi noted that collectivization, which would give the Soviet government control over agricultural resources in Ukraine and force the farmers to give up their property to the state, was met with resistance, which, combined with the history of resistance from earlier years, prompted Stalin to view Ukraine as a threat to the Soviet rule. Graziosi also notes that rural farmers and villagers constituted approximately 80% of the population of the Ukrainian SSR, and that same harsh policies were also applied to Kuban, another Soviet region predominantly populated by ethnic Ukrainians.

Graziosi noted that even under the most restrictive definitions of genocide, "deliberately inflicting on members of the group conditions of life calculated to bring about its physical destruction in whole or in part" is listed as a genocidal act. He also cited the time Lemkin had commented that, "generally speaking, genocide does not necessarily mean the immediate destruction of a nation ... It is intended rather to signify a coordinated plan of different actions aiming at the destruction of essential foundations of the life of national groups."

Graziosi also emphasized the root of the genocide was "unquestionably a subjective act" which was to use the famine in an "anti-Ukrainian sense on the basis of the 'national interpretation'". Without this, Graziosi said, the death toll would have been at most in the hundreds of thousands.

=== Robert Davies and Stephen Wheatcroft ===
Professors R. W. Davies and Stephen G. Wheatcroft state the famine was man-made but unintentional. They believe that a combination of rapid industrialization and two successive bad harvests (1931 and 1932) were the primary causes of the famine. Davies and Wheatcroft agree that Stalin's policies towards the peasants were brutal and ruthless and do not absolve Stalin from responsibility for the massive famine deaths; Wheatcroft says that the Soviet government's policies during the famine were criminal acts of fraud and manslaughter, though not outright murder or genocide. (Note: "We may well ask whether having revolutionarily high expectations is a crime? Of course it is, if it leads to an increase in the level of deaths, as a result of insufficient care being taken to safeguard the lives of those put at risk when the high ambitions failed to be fulfilled, and especially when it was followed by a cover-up. The same goes for not adjusting policy to unfolding evidence of crisis. But these are crimes of manslaughter and fraud rather than of murder. How heinous are they in comparison, say, with shooting over 600,000 citizens wrongly identified as enemies in 1937–8, or in shooting 25,000 Poles identified as a security risk in 1940, when there was no doubt as to the outcome of the orders? The conventional view is that manslaughter is less heinous than cold blooded murder.") Wheatcroft stated that nomadic and peasant culture was destroyed by Soviet collectivization. This complies with Raphael Lemkin's older concept of genocide, which included cultural destruction as an aspect of the crime, such as that of North American Indians and Australian Aborigines. (Note: "However, [Sarah Cameron] points out that in terms of the initial definition proposed by Raphael Lemkin there was an attempt to change and replace the essential culture of the indigenous nomadic herdsmen. Therefore, in this other earlier interpretation, it could be argued that the Kazakh nomads faced genocide. This is in the same sense that Russian peasants faced destruction of their culture in the creation of the new Soviet man, and that North American Indians and Australian Aborigines faced cultural destruction at the hands of Soviet, North American, and Australian states.") In addition while Wheatcroft rejects the genocide characterization of the famine, he states that "the grain collection campaign was associated with the reversal of the previous policy of Ukrainisation."

=== Andrei Markevich, Natalya Naumenko, Nancy Qian ===
According to a Centre for Economic Policy Research paper published in 2021 by Andrei Markevich, Natalya Naumenko, and Nancy Qian, the Holodomor matches the legal definitions of a genocide.

In the paper, the researchers give credit to Davies and Wheatcroft for correcting official production data at the aggregate Soviet level, but criticize them for ignoring other data, such as disaggregated data for mortality, production or procurement, and failing to "empirically evaluate their hypotheses or estimate regressions". In the work, it is also argued that out of a total 7 million deaths caused by the famine in the Soviet Union, approximately 40% of them were ethnic Ukrainians. They also point out that during non-famine years, mortality rate in Ukraine was lower than in the rest of the Soviet Union (18 per 1,000 compared to 22 per 1,000), however in 1933, when mortality in Belarus and Russia increased to 30 per 1,000, in Ukraine it jumped to 60 per 1,000, while famine mortality rate was four to six times higher in Ukraine than in Russia. Regions with higher Ukrainian population shares were struck harder with centrally planned policies corresponding to famine such as increased procurement rate and Ukrainian populated areas were given lower amounts of tractors which the paper argues demonstrates that ethnic discrimination across the board was centrally planned.

The analysis notes that according to 1926 and 1939 census, the overall number of ethnic Russians increased by 28%, while Belarusian population increased by almost 13%; meanwhile, number of ethnic Ukrainians decreased by 10%, and its share in the overall Soviet population dropped from 21.3% to 16.5%. When comparing population in the areas designated by the government as "grain-producing" areas, the overall number of ethnic Russians increased by 20% and Tatar population grew by 31%, while Ukrainian population decreased by almost 12%; the Russian share also increased from 41.9% to 48.1%, while Ukrainian dropped from 43.8% to 37.1%, meaning Russians overtook Ukrainians as the largest ethnic group in those areas. The analysis also comes to conclusion that mortality across Soviet regions was significantly higher depending on the percentage of ethnic Ukrainians, regardless of the republic. Nancy Qian notes in a lecture about the paper that the statistics are entirely consistent "with a model of ethnic bias and mass killing" for the famine presented by other authors.

=== Michael Ellman ===
Professor of economics Michael Ellman states that Stalin clearly committed crimes against humanity but whether he committed genocide depends on the definition of the term. In his 2007 article "Stalin and the Soviet Famine of 1932–33 Revisited", he wrote:

Team-Stalin's behaviour in 1930–34 clearly constitutes a crime against humanity (or a series of crimes against humanity) as that is defined in the 1998 Rome Statute of the International Criminal Court article 7, subsection 1 (d) and (h)[.] ... Was Team-Stalin also guilty of genocide? That depends on how 'genocide' is defined. ... The first physical element is the export of grain during a famine. ... The second physical element was the ban on migration from Ukraine and the North Caucasus. ... The third physical element is that 'Stalin made no effort to secure grain assistance from abroad[.]' ... If the present author were a member of the jury trying this case he would support a verdict of not guilty (or possibly the Scottish verdict of not proven). The reasons for this are as follows. First, the three physical elements in the alleged crime can all be given non-genocidal interpretations. Secondly, the two mental elements are not unambiguous evidence of genocide. Suspicion of an ethnic group may lead to genocide, but by itself is not evidence of genocide. Hence it would seem that the necessary proof of specific intent is lacking.

Ellman states that in the end it all depends on the definition of genocide and that if Stalin were guilty of genocide in the Holodomor, then "[m]any other events of the 1917–53 era (e.g. the deportation of whole nationalities, and the 'national operations' of 1937–38) would also qualify as genocide, as would the acts of [many Western countries]", such as the Atlantic slave trade, the atomic bombings of Hiroshima and Nagasaki, and the sanctions against Iraq in the 1990s, among many others. Historian Hiroaki Kuromiya finds it persuasive.

=== Stanislav Kulchytsky ===
Stanislav Kulchytsky recognizes the Holodomor as a genocide of Ukrainians as a national group rather than an ethnic group. He criticizes scholars' approach to study the history of the USSR with a "standard toolbox", which in his opinion does not work in the case of a country whose system does not follow basic principles of a natural historical process and evolution and was born out of Vladimir Lenin's conception of Ukraine. According to Kulchytsky, the Holodomor requires a comprehensive study of the political, social, and national aspects of Soviet collectivisation in Ukraine. Kulchytsky believes that the real intentions of some policies undertaken by the Soviet regime were not recorded on paper.

In his analysis, Kulchytsky believes that before the second half of 1932, there was no intention to murder by starvation. He acknowledges that Stalin made some concessions in 1930 as a response to the disturbances and when the famine broke out at the beginning of 1932, Stalin actually sent some relief to the regions that were struck by the famine. However, the grain procurement in the second half of 1932 was still under-delivering and unrest did not die down – for the first half of 1932, the OGPU recorded 932 disturbances in Ukraine, 173 in the North Caucasus, and only 43 in the Central Black Earth Oblast (out of 1,630 total). Reports two years prior recorded over 4,000 disturbances in Ukraine, while in other agricultural regions – Central Black Earth, Middle Volga, Lower Volga, and North Caucasus – the numbers were slightly above 1,000. The OGPU's summaries also cited public proclamations of Ukrainian insurgents to restore the independence of Ukraine, while reports by the Ukrainian officials included information about the declining popularity and authority of the party among peasants. According to Kulchytsky, these reports, combined with the overall economic crisis that weakened Stalin's positions within the party, the beginning of a national revival due to Ukrainization and distrust in Ukrainians in general, increased Stalin's fear of the possible "loss" of Ukraine; as proof he cites several letters sent by Stalin to highest-ranked officials, including a letter previously cited by James Mace.

A resolution of the central committee of the Communist Party (Bolsheviks) of Ukraine published on 18 November, combined with a telegram sent by Stalin to the Ukrainian officials on 1 January 1933 in which he demanded from the village councils to notify all farmers to deliver "previously stolen and hidden grain" to the state (against those who ignored the demand "harshest punitive measures" would be applied), essentially enabled mass blacklisting of Ukrainian villages followed by mass seizures of all food in those villages.

Analyzing mortality, Kulchytsky claims that it reflects the ethnic distribution of the rural population of Ukraine. Ethnic Ukrainian, Moldovan and Bulgarian people were disproportionately affected by the famine mainly because of their rural status. When comparing mortality among regions, Kulchytsky points out two territories which stood out significantly among others, even when taking into account the dependence of regions on agriculture and grain: the Ukrainian SSR and Kuban, the two regions where approximately two-thirds of the population was Ukrainian. To further support his theory, Kulchytskyy compares Ukraine with the Volga region and points out that in the Middle Volga region, cities suffered more from the famine, while among the peasantry fertility actually exceeded mortality as only grain was taken from them.

Kulchytsky also criticized Davies and Wheatcroft for the statement that procurements "were allocated among the republics, provinces, and districts with particular assignments for state farms, collective farms, and individual farmers" without adding any further information; he questioned why Ukraine produced more grain in 1930 than the Central Black Earth Oblast, Middle and Lower Volga and North Caucasus regions all together, which had never been done before, and on average gave 4.7 quintals (470 kg) of grain from every sown hectare to the state – "a record-breaking index of marketability" – but was unable to fulfill the grain quota for 1930 until May 1931. Ukraine produced a similar amount of grain in 1931, but by the late spring of 1932 "many districts were left with no reserves of produce or fodder at all".

=== Hiroaki Kuromiya ===
Hiroaki Kuromiya states that although the famine was man-made and much of the deaths could have been avoided had it not been for Stalin's agricultural policies, he finds the evidence for the charge of genocide to be insufficient, and states that it is unlikely that Stalin intentionally caused the famine to kill millions, that he used famine as an alternative to the ethnic deportations that were commonly used as collective punishment under Stalin's rule, or that the famine was specifically engineered to target Ukrainians.

Noting that Stalin had few qualms with killing opponents of his rule and directly ordered several episodes of mass murder, Kuromiya finds the absence of an order to engineer a famine as punishment as unusual, in contrast to the Great Purge and the various deportations and 'national operations' which he personally ordered, and as pointing to the unlikelihood of Stalin deliberately orchestrating mass starvation. He also cites several measures taken by the Soviet government that, although ineffective, provide evidence against the intentionalist thesis, such as nine occasions of curtailing grain exports from different famine-stricken regions and clandestinely purchasing foreign aid to help alleviate the famine. He goes on to suggest that the prioritisation of military food stockpiles over the peasantry was likely motivated by Stalin's paranoia about what he believed to be an impending war with Japan and/or Poland rather than a desire to deliberately starve Ukrainians to death.

=== Norman Naimark ===
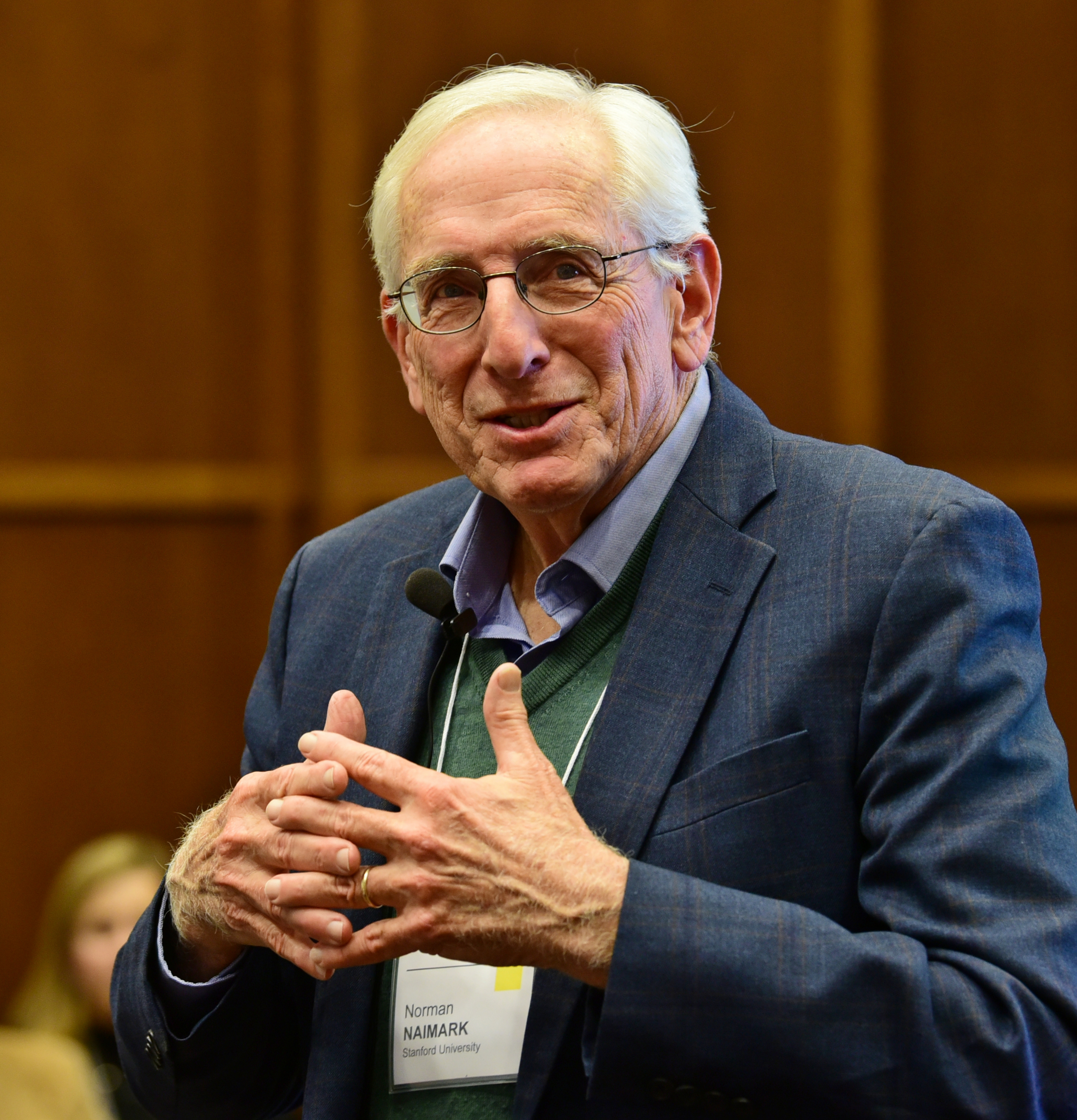
Norman Naimark in 2018

Professor of East European studies Norman Naimark states that the Holodomor's deaths were intentional and thus were genocide. In his 2010 book Stalin's Genocides, Naimark wrote:

The Ukrainian killer famine should be considered an act of genocide. There is enough evidence – if not overwhelming evidence – to indicate that Stalin and his lieutenants knew that the widespread famine in the USSR in 1932–33 hit Ukraine particularly hard, and that they were ready to see millions of Ukrainian peasants die as a result. They made no efforts to provide relief; they prevented the peasants from seeking food themselves in the cities or elsewhere in the USSR; and they refused to relax restrictions on grain deliveries until it was too late. Stalin's hostility to the Ukrainians and their attempts to maintain their form of "home rule" as well as his anger that Ukrainian peasants resisted collectivization fueled the killer famine.

Naimark also contrasted the treatment of the famine of Ukrainians to the treatment of Kazakhs during the 1930–1933 Kazakh famine, stating that "Kazakhs were not prevented from escaping famine-struck regions or seeking aid in the cities and towns, though there were serious efforts to keep them from fleeing across the sparsely guarded border into China", as opposed to the mass arrests of Ukrainians attempting to flee, most of whom were returned to their villages, and the rest of whom were sent to Gulags.

=== Timothy Snyder ===
Professor of history Timothy Snyder stated that the starvation was "deliberate" and that several of the most lethal policies applied only, or mostly, to Ukraine. In his 2010 book Bloodlands, Snyder stated:

In the waning weeks of 1932, facing no external security threat and no challenge from within, with no conceivable justification except to prove the inevitability of his rule, Stalin chose to kill millions of people in Soviet Ukraine. ... It was not food shortages but food distribution that killed millions in Soviet Ukraine, and it was Stalin who decided who was entitled to what.

In a 2017 Q&A, Snyder said that he believed the famine was genocide but refrained from using the term because it might confuse people, explaining:

If you asked me, is the Ukrainian Holodomor genocide? Yes, in my view, it is. In my view, it meets the criteria of the law of genocide of 1948, the Convention – it meets the ideas that Raphael Lemkin laid down. Is Armenia genocide? Yes, I believe legally it very easily meets that qualification. I just don't think that means what people think it means. Because there are people who hear the word "genocide" and they think it means the attempt to kill every man, woman and child, and the Armenian genocide is closer to the Holocaust than most other cases, right, but it's not the same thing. So, I hesitate to use "genocide" because I think every time the word "genocide" is used it provokes misunderstanding.

=== Ronald Grigor Suny ===
Ronald Grigor Suny contrasts the intentions and motivation for the Holodomor and other Soviet mass killings with those of the Armenian genocide. He states that "although on moral grounds one form of mass killing is as reprehensible as another", for social scientists and historians "there is utility in restricting the term 'genocide' to what might more accurately be referred to as 'ethnocide,' that is, the deliberate attempt to eliminate a designated group." His definition of genocide "involves both the physical and the cultural extermination of a people".

Suny states that "Stalin's intentions and actions during the Ukrainian famine, no matter what sensationalist claims are made by nationalists and anti-Communists, were not the extermination of the Ukrainian people", and "a different set of explanations is required" for the Holodomor as well as for the Great Purges, the Gulag, and the Soviet ethnic cleansings of minority ethnic groups.

=== Stephen Kotkin ===
According to Stephen Kotkin, while "there is no question of Stalin's responsibility for the famine" and many deaths could have been prevented if not for the "insufficient" and counterproductive Soviet measures, there is no evidence for Stalin's intention to kill the Ukrainians deliberately. According to Kotkin, the Holodomor "was a foreseeable byproduct of the collectivization campaign that Stalin forcibly imposed, but not an intentional murder. He needed the peasants to produce more grain, and to export the grain to buy the industrial machinery for the industrialization. Peasant output and peasant production was critical for Stalin's industrialization."

=== Viktor Kondrashin ===
Historian Viktor Kondrashin asserts that Stalin's forced collectivisation programme drastically decreased peasants' quality of life and that it was the leading catalyst of the famine, and that although a notable drought did occur in 1931, it and other natural factors were not the primary causes of the famine. However, he rejects the claim that the famine was a targeted genocide of Ukrainians or any other ethnic group in the Soviet Union. According to Kondrashin, in some aspects, conditions for peasants were actually even worse and oppressive laws concerning agriculture even harsher in the Russian regions of the Kuban and Lower Volga, making the genocide thesis untenable in his view. While dismissing the notion that the famine was a genocide, Kondrashin does note, however, that Stalin took advantage of the famine crisis to neutralise the Ukrainian intelligentsia on the pretexts that they were a subversive force behind anti-Soviet uprisings by peasants. Kondrashin also assigns part of the blame for the famine to foreign governments that continued to trade with and buy food from the Soviet Union, in particular the United Kingdom, which imported approximately two million tonnes of Soviet grain during the famine years of 1932 and 1933.

== Other issues in the discourse ==
=== Colonialism and imperialism ===
Most discourse over the question of the Holodomor as a genocide is based on the UN's Genocide Convention; however, numerous genocide definitions have been presented in genocide studies. In discourse regarding the genocide of Indigenous Americans, notions such as "structural genocide" have been presented to discuss, for example, the California genocide. Joseph Stalin, due to factional struggles with the Bukharin wing of the party, peasant resistance to the NEP under Lenin, and the need for industrialization, declared a need to extract a "tribute" or "tax" from the peasantry. This idea was supported by most of the party in the 1920s. The tribute collected by the party took on the form of a virtual war against the peasantry that would lead to its cultural destruction and the relegating of the countryside to essentially a colony homogenized to the urban culture of the Soviet elite. This campaign of "colonizing" the peasantry had its roots both in old Russian Imperialism and modern social engineering of the nation state yet with key differences to the latter such as Soviet repression reflecting more the weakness of said state rather than its strength. In this vein some sources discuss the Soviet famine in relation to a project of imperialism or colonialism of Ukraine by the Soviet state and talk of colonial genocide often invokes a more nuanced and expansive discussions of genocidal processes including issues neglected in the UN definition such as cultural genocide.

=== Genocide as a cause or part of the famine ===
Another nuance to the genocide debate is whether the destruction of the Ukrainian population needs to be the sole or primary intent of the famine in order for it to be a genocide. For example, Andrea Graziosi argues the initial causes of the famine were an unintentional byproduct of the process of collectivization, but that once the famine began, starvation was selectively "instrumentalized" against Ukrainians.

== Government recognition ==
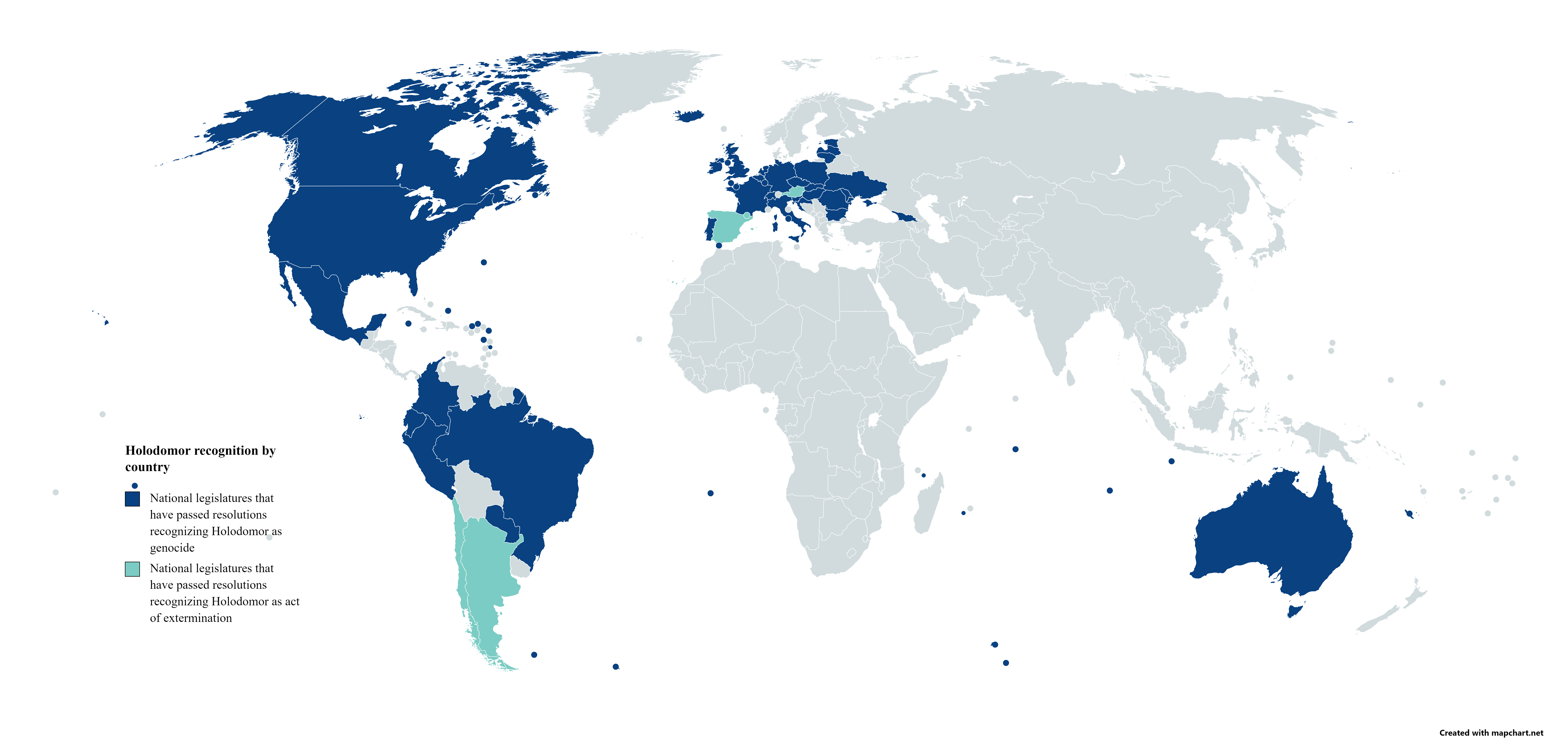
Recognition of the Holodomor by country

Ukraine's Ministry of Foreign Affairs has run campaigns and lobbied the United Nations and the Council of Europe to recognise the Holodomor as a genocide internationally. The governments of various countries have issued statements recognizing the Holodomor as genocide including Ukraine since 2006, and 13 other countries as of 2015.

In November 2022, the Belarusian opposition in exile recognised the Holodomor as a genocide, and Pope Francis compared the Russian war in Ukraine with its targeted destruction of civilian infrastructure to the "terrible Holodomor Genocide", during an address at St. Peter's Square. As of January 2026, 34 countries recognise the Holodomor as a genocide.

Countries whose legislatures have passed a resolution recognizing the Holodomor as a genocide:

- Australia, 28 October 1993
- Belgium, 10 March 2023
- Bulgaria, 1 February 2023
- Canada, 20 June 2003
- Colombia, 21 December 2007
- Croatia, moved 15 June 2023, approved 28 June 2023
- Czech Republic, 6 April 2022
- Ecuador, 30 October 2007
- Estonia, 20 October 1993
- France, 28 March 2023
- Georgia, 20 December 2005
- Germany, 30 November 2022
- Hungary, 26 November 2003
- Iceland, 22 March 2023
- Italy, 26 July 2023
- Latvia, 13 March 2008
- Lithuania, 24 November 2005
- Luxembourg, 13 June 2023
- Mexico, 19 February 2008
- Moldova, 24 November 2022
- Netherlands, 7 July 2023
- Paraguay, 25 October 2007
- Peru, 19 June 2007
- Poland, 4 December 2006
- Portugal, 2 March 2017
- Romania, 24 November 2022
- Slovakia, 20 June 2023
- Slovenia, 23 May 2023
- Switzerland, 24 September 2024
- Ukraine, 28 November 2006
- United Kingdom, 25 May 2023 (resolution passed by the House of Commons)
  - Wales, 25 October 2023
- United States, 11 December 2018 (resolution passed by the House of Representatives; on 4 October 2018 resolution passed by the Senate)

Countries whose legislatures have partially passed a resolution recognizing the Holodomor as a genocide:

- Brazil, 26 April 2022 (resolution passed by the Federal Senate)
- Ireland, 24 November 2022 (resolution passed by the Seanad)

Countries whose parliamentary factions have issued joint declarations recognizing the Holodomor as a genocide:

- Finland, 24 November 2023 (joint declaration by all parliamentary faction leaders due to the lack of a procedural mechanism for historical resolutions)

Other political bodies whose legislatures have passed a resolution recognizing Holodomor as a genocide:

- European Union, 15 December 2022
- Council of Europe, 12 October 2023
- Chechen Republic of Ichkeria (government in exile), 26 November 2022

Other countries that have issued official documents describing the Holodomor as genocide:

- Vatican City, 2 April 2004

== See also ==
- Outline of the Holodomor
- Bibliography of the Holodomor
- Allegations of genocide of Ukrainians in the Russo-Ukrainian War
- Assessment of the Kazakh famine of 1931–1933
- Droughts and famines in Russia and the Soviet Union
- Functionalism–intentionalism debate
- Law of Spikelets
- Mass killings under communist regimes
- Outline of genocide studies
