= Famine in Ukraine (disambiguation) =

Famine in Ukraine may refer to:

- 1921–1923 famine in Ukraine
- Holodomor, 1932–1933 human-made famine in Soviet Ukraine
- Soviet famine of 1946–1947 in Ukraine
