= The Harvest of Sorrow =

1986 book by Robert Conquest

- Cover of the first edition
- Authors: Robert Conquest
- Original title: The Harvest of Sorrow: Soviet Collectivization and the Terror-Famine
- Language: English
- Subjects: Holodomor; Soviet famine of 1932–1933
- Publisher: Oxford University Press
- Publication date: 9 October 1986
- Publication place: United Kingdom
- Media type: Print
- Pages: 412
- ISBN: 9780195051803

The Harvest of Sorrow: Soviet Collectivization and the Terror-Famine is a 1986 book by British historian Robert Conquest published by the Oxford University Press. It was written with the assistance of historian James Mace, a junior fellow at the Harvard Ukrainian Research Institute, who started doing research for the book following the advice of the director of the institute. Conquest wrote the book in order "to register in the public consciousness of the West a knowledge of and feeling for major events, involving millions of people and millions of deaths, which took place within living memory."

The book deals with the collectivization of agriculture in 1929 to 1931 in Ukraine and elsewhere in the Soviet Union under Joseph Stalin's direction, and the Soviet famine of 1932–1933 and Holodomor which resulted. Millions of peasants died due to starvation, deportation to labor camps and execution. Conquest's thesis was characterized as "the famine was deliberately inflicted for ethnic reasons—it was done in order to undermine the Ukrainian nation", or that it constituted genocide.

The Harvest of Sorrow won Conquest the Antonovych prize in 1987 and the Shevchenko National Prize in 1994.

== Background ==
In 1981, the Harvard Ukrainian Research Institute approached Conquest with the project of a book on the 1932–1933 famine. The Ukrainian National Association, a New Jersey–based ethnic fraternal group with a hard-right tradition (its newspaper Svoboda was banned by Canada during World War II for its pro-German sympathies), sponsored the work with a $80,000 subsidy. The grant was earmarked for Conquest's research expenses, including the assistance of historian James Mace, a junior fellow at the institute and Conquest protégé. In accepting the sponsorship, Conquest was perceived as being in the pocket of the Ukrainians. In response to those claims, Conquest stated: "I did not do the book specifically on the Ukraine. About half the book is on the non-Ukrainian side, the rest of the Soviet peasantry—there is a whole chapter on the Kazakhs, for example. The sponsors made no attempt whatever to suggest what I should write. In fact, I'm in trouble with some of them for refusing to drop the 'the' from 'the Ukraine.'"

The United States Congress promoted awareness of the Holodomor and set U.S. Commission on the Ukraine Famine, which was authorized in 1985 and headed by James Mace. The commission conducted archival and oral history research under a $382,000 congressional appropriation, leading to a final report conclusion in 1988 that "Joseph Stalin and those around him committed genocide against the Ukrainians in 1932–1933." Mace's research formed the basis for Conquest's book. For Mace's wife Nataliya Dzyubenko-Mace, the commission was instrumental in alerting the U.S. public and politicians to these horrific crimes, helping rouse U.S.society from political lethargy.

The Harvest of Sorrow had a clear moral intent, namely that if the older Soviet leaders were direct accomplices in an artificially contrived famine and the younger leaders today still justify such procedure, then it followed that they might be willing to kill tens of millions of foreigners or suffer a loss of millions of their own subjects in a war. Conquest stated: "I don't think they want to blow Western populations to pieces. But if they came to America and imposed the collective farm system, then they might well organize a famine."

== Reception ==
According to David R. Marples, the book served as an indicator of divisions in Western scholarship on the subject. Marples writes that Conquest's book was "generally well received though Conquest admitted subsequently that he had lacked sources to confirm his estimates of death tolls." Historian Ronald Grigor Suny commented that Conquest's estimation for famine deaths was almost quadruple that of many fellow Soviet specialists.

In a 1987 review for the Population and Development Review, L. A. Kosiński describes it as a "carefully researched book based on a variety of sources—including eyewitness accounts, letters, official Soviet documents and press releases, reports and analyses of both Soviet and foreign scholars, and Soviet fiction ... ." According to Kosiński, Conquest "presents the shocking story of a 'revolution from above,' to use Stalin's words, that shook Soviet society and left a long-standing impacts." Conquest's account of the events is that of "a war declared by an arrogant, revolutionary regime on the peasantry and on certain national communities within the country (mainly Ukrainians and Kazakhs), resulting in total victory for the central power at an exorbitant cost."

Conquest's thesis that the famine constituted genocide and was deliberately inflicted is controversial and remains part of the ongoing debates on the Holodomor genocide question, with Vladimir N. Brovkin describing it in a 1987 review for the Harvard Ukrainian Studies as a challenge to the "revisionist school" of historians and Alexander Nove stating "the Ukrainian countryside suffered terribly. But Conquest seems prone to accept the Ukrainian nationalist myth."

Largely accepting his thesis was Geoffrey A. Hosking, who wrote that "Conquest's research establishes beyond doubt, however, that the famine was deliberately inflicted there [in Ukraine] for ethnic reasons—it was done in order to undermine the Ukrainian nation." Peter Wiles of the London School of Economics stated that "Conquest had 'adopted the Ukraine exile view [on the origins of the famine of 1932–33], and he has persuaded this reviewer.'"

Dissenting from his thesis was Craig Whitney, who stated in The New York Times Book Review that "[t]he eyewitness testimony may be reliable, but far more debatable is the thesis that the famine was specifically aimed as an instrument of genocide against the Ukraine. The clear implication of this book is that the author has taken the side of his Ukrainian sources on this issue, even though much of his evidence does not support it well." While generally praising the book, Nove wrote that "the majority of those who died in the famine were Ukrainian peasants is not in dispute. But did they die because they were peasants, or because they were Ukrainians? As Conquest himself points out, the largest number of victims proportionately were in fact Kazakhs, and no one has attributed this to Stalin's anti-Kazakh views."

Later scholarship has been divided on the question as well. Marples states: "Hiroaki Kuromiya notes that those who examine the famine from a general Soviet perspective downplay any specific Ukrainian factor, while specialists on Ukraine generally support the concept of a genocidal famine." Marples states that the most "notable work in the school of writing that maintains that the famine was not genocide" is by R. W. Davies and Stephen G. Wheatcroft.

== Criticism ==
In a 1988 article for The Village Voice titled "In Search of a Soviet Holocaust", American investigative journalist Jeff Coplon accused Conquest of misusing the sources in his work The Harvest of Sorrow in which Conquest posits that the famine was genocide. Coplon writes that Conquest "weaves his terror-famine from unverifiable (and notoriously biased) émigré accounts. ... Black Deeds of the Kremlin, a period piece published by Ukrainian émigrés in 1953, is footnoted no less than 145 times. Conquest can be deftly selective when it suits his purpose. He borrows heavily from Lev Kopelev's The Education of a True Believer, but ignores Kopelev when the latter recalls Ukrainian villages that were relatively untouched by famine, or relief efforts by a Communist village council." Coplon argues that Conquest fixes on seven million famine deaths, including six million Ukrainians, with no appendix to show how his numbers are derived. Sergei Maksudov, a Soviet émigré scholar much cited by Conquest, concluded that the famine caused 3.5 million premature deaths in Ukraine—700,000 from starvation and the rest from diseases due to malnutrition. In a letter to the editors, Conquest dismissed the article as "error and absurdity."

Coplon reported opinions of expert Sovietologists rejecting "Conquest's hunt for a new holocaust." While these Sovietologist agree the famine was a terrible thing, they argue that it was not genocide and point out that the Soviet famine of 1932–1933 was hardly confined to Ukraine, that it reached deep into the Central Black Earth Region, that Joseph Stalin had far less control over collectivization than is widely assumed, and that radical district leaders made their own rules as they went along. According to Alexander Dallin of Stanford University, the father of modern Sovietology, "[t]here is no evidence it was intentionally directed against Ukrainians. That would be totally out of keeping with what we know – it makes no sense." According to Moshe Lewin of the University of Pennsylvania, whose Russian Peasants and the Soviet Power was groundbreaking in social history, was quoted as saying: "This is crap, rubbish. I am an anti-Stalinist, but I don't see how this [genocide] campaign adds to our knowledge. It's adding horrors, adding horrors, until it becomes a pathology." Lynne Viola of SUNY-Binghamton, the first historian from the United States to examine Moscow's Central State Archive on Soviet collectivization, stated to "absolutely reject it. Why in God's name would this paranoid government consciously produce a famine when they were terrified of war [with Germany]?" Roberta T. Manning of Boston College, a veteran Sovietologist, argued that Conquest is "terrible at doing research. He misuses sources, he twists everything."

== Partial disavowal of terror-famine hypothesis ==
In response to criticism from R. W. Davies and Stephen G. Wheatcroft following the opening of Soviet archives Conquest responded in a 2003 letter that he did not believe "Stalin purposely inflicted the 1933 famine. No. What I argue is that with resulting famine imminent, he could have prevented it, but put “Soviet interest” other than feeding the starving first – thus consciously abetting it."

== See also ==
- Kazakh famine of 1931–1933
- Red Famine: Stalin's War on Ukraine
- Stalin: Breaker of Nations
- Stalin: Paradoxes of Power, 1878–1928
- Stalin: Waiting for Hitler, 1929–1941
- Harvester of Sorrow – Metallica's song inspired by this book

== Bibliography ==
- Conquest, Robert (1987). The Harvest of Sorrow: Soviet Collectivization and the Terror-Famine (reprint, paperback ed.). Oxford: Oxford University Press. ISBN 9780195051803.
