= Holodomor Genocide Memorial =

Holodomor Memorial to Victims of the Ukrainian Famine-Genocide of 1932–1933
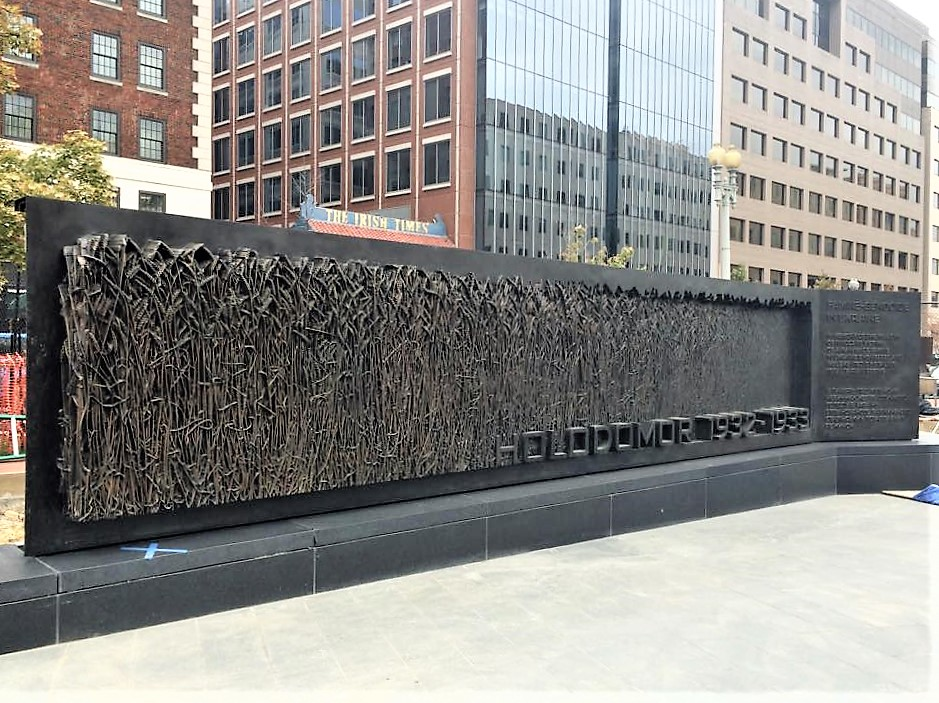
- Interactive map of Holodomor Memorial to Victims of the Ukrainian Famine-Genocide of 1932–1933
- Location: Washington, D.C., United States
- Coordinates: 38°53′51″N 77°00′34″W
- Designer: Larysa Kurylas
- Type: sculpture
- Opening date: November 7, 2015
- Website: ukrainegenocide.com

The Holodomor Memorial to Victims of the Ukrainian Famine-Genocide of 1932–1933 was opened in Washington, D.C., United States, on November 7, 2015. Congress approved creation of the Holodomor Memorial in 2006.

The memorial was built by the National Park Service and the Ukrainian government to honor the victims of the Ukrainian Famine-Genocide of 1932–33 and to educate the American public.

The memorial, designed by Larysa Kurylas, is one of three monuments in Washington, D.C., designed or co-designed by women—the others being the Vietnam Veterans Memorial and the National 9/11 Pentagon Memorial.

The memorial is located near the United States Capitol building at the intersection of North Capitol Street, Massachusetts Avenue, and F Street N.W. It is diagonal to the Smithsonian's National Postal Museum, about one block from Union Station.

== See also ==
- Outline of the Holodomor
- Bibliography of the Holodomor
