= Holodomor: Voices of Survivors =

- Directed by: Ariadna Ochrymovych
- Produced by: Ariadna Ochrymovych
- Narrated by: Luba Goy; Franko Diakowsky; Peter Higginson
- Production company: Black Sea Media
- Release date: 2015
- Running time: 30 minutes
- Country: Canada
- Language: English

Holodomor: Voices of Survivors is a 2015 Canadian short documentary film by filmmaker Ariadna Ochrymovych about the 1932–33 Holodomor famine in Soviet Ukraine. It documents oral history from Ukrainian Canadian survivors of the Holodomor, which is recognized by Ukraine, Canada and 28 other countries as of 2023 as a genocide of the Ukrainian people carried out by the Soviet Union under Joseph Stalin. Ochrymovych conducted and filmed over 100 interviews across Canada.

The production of the film was supported by the Department of Canadian Heritage, Ukrainian Canadian Congress, Ukrainian Canadian Research and Documentation Centre, Shevchenko Foundation, Ukrainian credit unions and private donations.

== Reception ==
Holodomor: Voices of Survivors received the Golden Sheaf Award for Best Research at the Yorkton Film Festival in May 2016.
