= Bibliography of the Holodomor =

Bibliography of the Holodomor Голодомор
- Starved peasants on a street in Kharkiv, 1933, Ukraine's capital at the time
- Country: Soviet Union
- Location: Ukraine SSR
- Period: 1932–1933
- Total deaths: Around 3.5 to 5 million in Ukraine
- Causes: Industrialization policy during the first five year plan; Dekulakization; Soviet collectivization of farming; Intentional starvation of Ukrainians (disputed)
- Relief: Foreign relief rejected by the state. 176,200 and 325,000 tons of grains provided by the state as food and seed aids between February and July 1933.
- Preceded by: 1921–1923 famine in Ukraine
- Succeeded by: Soviet famine of 1946–1947 in Ukraine

This is a select bibliography of English language academic level books and journal articles, published mainly after World War II, (Note: Works published during or before World War II should be limited to areas where there are no significant post-World War II books on the subject or when the work in question has significant historical merit.) about the history of the Holodomor and its historical context.

The Holodomor, (Note: Ukrainian: Голодомор, IPA: [ɦolodoˈmɔr]; derived from морити голодом, moryty holodom, 'to kill by starvation'; also literally known as "Extermination by Hunger" or "Hunger-extermination") was a massive man-made famine genocide in Soviet Ukraine from 1932 to 1933 that killed millions of Ukrainians. The Holodomor was part of the wider Soviet famine of 1930–1933 which affected the major grain-producing areas of the Soviet Union.

Works listed here are cited in the notes or bibliographies of scholarly sources. Each is published by an academic or major press, written by a recognized expert, or substantially reviewed in scholarly journals; borderline cases are omitted. A selection of primary sources are included. Many of the books below carry their own bibliographies; see the Further reading section for other bibliographies, and the External links section for historical sites, academic sites, and museums.

Citations follow APA style. (Note: Entries are in plain text APA 7 format without templates; templates are used only for reviews and notes.) Book have citations to academic journal or mainstream published reviews when available. For books only partly about the subject, relevant chapter or section titles are provided when useful and available. Translators of the original-language edition are included when possible. In cases where a title or name has appeared with more than one English spelling, the most recent published form is used and a footnote documents any earlier title under which the work appeared.

== General ==
- Antonovych, M. (2015). Legal accountability for the Holodomor-genocide of 1932–1933 (Great Famine) in Ukraine. Kyiv-Mohyla Law and Politics Journal, 1, 159–176.
- Applebaum, A. (2017). Red famine: Stalin's war on Ukraine. Doubleday.
- Bilinsky, Y. (1999). Was the Ukrainian famine of 1932–1933 genocide? Journal of Genocide Research, 1(2), 147–156.
- Cameron, S. (2018). The hungry steppe: Famine, violence, and the making of Soviet Kazakhstan. Cornell University Press.
- Cherfas, T. (2013). Reporting Stalin's famine: Jones and Muggeridge: A case study in forgetting and rediscovery. Kritika: Explorations in Russian and Eurasian History, 14(4), 775–804.
- Conquest, R. (1986). The harvest of sorrow: Soviet collectivization and the terror-famine. Oxford University Press.
- Courtois, S., Werth, N., Panné, J.-L., Paczkowski, A., Bartošek, K., & Margolin, J.-L. (1999). The black book of communism: Crimes, terror, repression (J. Murphy & M. Kramer, Trans.). Harvard University Press.
- Curran, D., Luciuk, L., & Newby, A. G. (Eds.). (2015). Famines in European economic history: The last great European famines reconsidered. Routledge.
- Davies, R. W., & Wheatcroft, S. G. (2002). The Soviet famine of 1932–33 and the crisis in agriculture. In S. G. Wheatcroft (Ed.), Challenging traditional views of Russian history (pp. 69–91). Palgrave Macmillan.
- Davies, R. W., & Wheatcroft, S. G. (2004). The years of hunger: Soviet agriculture, 1931–1933 (The Industrialisation of Soviet Russia, Vol. 5). Palgrave Macmillan.
- Davies, R. W., & Wheatcroft, S. G. (2006). Stalin and the Soviet famine of 1932–33: A reply to Ellman. Europe-Asia Studies, 58(4), 625–633.
- Dmytrychyn, I. (2021). The voyage enchanté of Edouard Herriot in Ukraine. Ukraïna Moderna, 30–31, 216–232.
- Dreyer, N. (2018). Genocide, Holodomor and Holocaust discourse as echo of historical injury and as rhetorical radicalization in the Russian–Ukrainian conflict of 2013–18. Journal of Genocide Research, 20(4), 545–564.
- Ellman, M. (2005). The role of leadership perceptions and of intent in the Soviet famine of 1931–1934. Europe-Asia Studies, 57(6), 823–841.
- Ellman, M. (2007). Stalin and the Soviet famine of 1932–33 revisited. Europe-Asia Studies, 59(4), 663–693.
- Fitzpatrick, S. (1994). Stalin's peasants: Resistance and survival in the Russian village after collectivization. Oxford University Press.
- Fonzi, P. (2020). Non-Soviet perspectives on the Great Famine: A comparative analysis of British, Italian, Polish, and German sources. Nationalities Papers, 48(3), 444–459. doi:10.1017/nps.2019.27
- Gamache, R. (2013). Gareth Jones: Eyewitness to the Holodomor. Welsh Academic Press.
- Gamache, R. (2014). Breaking eggs for a Holodomor: Walter Duranty, the New York Times, and the denigration of Gareth Jones. Journalism History, 39(4), 208–218.
- Graziosi, A. (1996). The great Soviet peasant war: Bolsheviks and peasants, 1917–1933. Ukrainian Research Institute, Harvard University.
- Graziosi, A. (2005). The Soviet 1931–1933 famines and the Ukrainian Holodomor: Is a new interpretation possible, and what would its consequences be? Harvard Ukrainian Studies, 27(1/4), 97–115.
- Graziosi, A., Hajda, L. A., & Hryn, H. (Eds.). (2013). After the Holodomor: The enduring impact of the great famine on Ukraine. Ukrainian Research Institute, Harvard University.
- Graziosi, A. (2020). Introduction to the special issue on the Soviet famines of 1930–1933. Nationalities Papers, 48(3), 435–443.
- Hryn, H. (Ed.). (2008). Hunger by design: The great Ukrainian famine and its Soviet context. Ukrainian Research Institute, Harvard University.
- Irvin-Erickson, D. (2017). Raphaël Lemkin and the concept of genocide. University of Pennsylvania Press.
- Isajiw, W. W. (Ed.). (2003). Famine-genocide in Ukraine, 1932–1933: Western archives, testimonies and new research. Ukrainian Canadian Research and Documentation Centre.
- Kazyrytski, L. (2026). Extermination by starvation and genocide in Ukraine, 1932–1933. Journal of International Criminal Justice. Advance online publication.
- Khiterer, V. (2020). The Holodomor and Jews in Kyiv and Ukraine: An introduction and observations on a neglected topic. Nationalities Papers, 48(3), 460–475.
- Kis, O. (2021). Women's experience of the Holodomor: Challenges and ambiguities of motherhood. Journal of Genocide Research, 23(4), 527–546.
- Klid, B., & Motyl, A. J. (Eds.). (2012). The Holodomor reader: A sourcebook on the famine of 1932–1933 in Ukraine. Canadian Institute of Ukrainian Studies Press.
- Klid, B. (Ed.). (2022). Empire, colonialism, and famine in the nineteenth and twentieth centuries. Canadian Institute of Ukrainian Studies Press.
- Klymenko, L. (2016). The Holodomor law and national trauma construction in Ukraine. Canadian Slavonic Papers, 58(4), 341–361.
- Kulchytsky, S. (2018). The famine of 1932–1933 in Ukraine: An anatomy of the Holodomor (A. Kinsella, Trans.). Canadian Institute of Ukrainian Studies Press.
- Kulʹchytsʹkyi, S. (2015). The Holodomor of 1932–33: How and why? East/West: Journal of Ukrainian Studies, 2(1), 93–116. doi:10.21226/T23K51
- Kuromiya, H. (2008). The Soviet famine of 1932–1933 reconsidered. Europe-Asia Studies, 60(4), 663–675.
- Lemkin, R. (2008). Soviet genocide in the Ukraine. In L. Y. Luciuk (Ed.), Holodomor: Reflections on the great famine of 1932–1933 in Soviet Ukraine (pp. 235–242). Kashtan Press. (Original work written ca. 1953)
- Levchuk, N., Wolowyna, O., Rudnytskyi, O., Kovbasiuk, A., & Kulyk, N. (2020). Regional 1932–1933 famine losses: A comparative analysis of Ukraine and Russia. Nationalities Papers, 48(3), 492–512.
- Luciuk, L. Y. (Ed.). (2004). Not worthy: Walter Duranty's Pulitzer Prize and the New York Times. Kashtan Press.
- Luciuk, L. Y. (Ed.). (2008). Holodomor: Reflections on the great famine of 1932–1933 in Soviet Ukraine. Kashtan Press.
- Mace, J. E. (1988). The politics of famine: American government and press response to the Ukrainian famine, 1932–1933. Holocaust and Genocide Studies, 3(1), 75–94. doi:10.1093/hgs/3.1.75
- Makuch, A., & Sysyn, F. E. (Eds.). (2015). Contextualizing the Holodomor: The impact of thirty years of Ukrainian famine studies. Canadian Institute of Ukrainian Studies Press.
- Markevich, A., Naumenko, N., & Qian, N. (2025). The causes of Ukrainian famine mortality, 1932–33. Review of Economic Studies, 92(5), 3276–3305. doi:10.1093/restud/rdae091
- Marples, D. R. (2007). Heroes and villains: Creating national history in contemporary Ukraine. Central European University Press.
- Marples, D. R. (2009). Ethnic issues in the famine of 1932–1933 in Ukraine. Europe-Asia Studies, 61(3), 505–518.
- Martin, T. (2001). The affirmative action empire: Nations and nationalism in the Soviet Union, 1923–1939. Cornell University Press.
- Moore, R. (2012). "A crime against humanity arguably without parallel in European history": Genocide and the "politics" of victimhood in Western narratives of the Ukrainian Holodomor. Australian Journal of Politics & History, 58(3), 367–379.
- Motyl, A. J. (2010). Deleting the Holodomor: Ukraine unmakes itself. World Affairs, 173(3), 25–33.
- Naimark, N. M. (2010). Stalin's genocides. Princeton University Press.
- Naimark, N. M. (2015). How the Holodomor can be integrated into our understanding of genocide. East/West: Journal of Ukrainian Studies, 2(1), 117–131.
- Naumenko, N. (2021). The political economy of famine: The Ukrainian famine of 1933. The Journal of Economic History, 81(1), 156–197.
- Nefedov, S., & Ellman, M. (2019). The Soviet famine of 1931–1934: Genocide, a result of poor harvests, or the outcome of a conflict between the state and the peasants? Europe-Asia Studies, 71(6), 1048–1065.
- Prown, H. H. (2025). "Every rotten slander": Holodomor denial and the origins of the American popular front. Politics, Religion & Ideology, 26(1), 1–19.
- Rudnytskyi, O., Levchuk, N., Wolowyna, O., Shevchuk, P., & Kovbasiuk, A. (2015). Demography of a man-made human catastrophe: The case of massive famine in Ukraine 1932–1933. Canadian Studies in Population, 42(1–2), 53–80.
- Rudnytskyi, O., Kulchytskyi, S., Gladun, O., & Kulyk, N. (2020). The 1921–1923 famine and the Holodomor of 1932–1933 in Ukraine: Common and distinctive features. Nationalities Papers, 48(3), 549–568.
- Schabas, W. A. (2009). Genocide in international law: The crime of crimes (2nd ed.). Cambridge University Press.
- Serbyn, R., & Krawchenko, B. (Eds.). (1986). Famine in Ukraine, 1932–1933. Canadian Institute of Ukrainian Studies.
- Serbyn, R. (2009). Lemkin on genocide of nations. Journal of International Criminal Justice, 7(1), 123–130.
- Snyder, T. (2010). Bloodlands: Europe between Hitler and Stalin. Basic Books.
- Sysyn, F. E. (1999). The Ukrainian famine of 1932–3: The role of the Ukrainian diaspora in research and public discussion. In L. Chorbajian & G. Shirinian (Eds.), Studies in comparative genocide (pp. 182–215). Palgrave Macmillan.
- Tauger, M. B. (1991). The 1932 harvest and the famine of 1933. Slavic Review, 50(1), 70–89.
- Taylor, S. J. (1990). Stalin's apologist: Walter Duranty, the New York Times's man in Moscow. Oxford University Press.
- Vallin, J., Meslé, F., Adamets, S., & Pyrozhkov, S. (2002). A new estimate of Ukrainian population losses during the crises of the 1930s and 1940s. Population Studies, 56(3), 249–264.
- Viola, L. (1986). Bab'i bunty and peasant women's protest during collectivization. Russian Review, 45(1), 23–42.
- Viola, L. (1996). Peasant rebels under Stalin: Collectivization and the culture of peasant resistance. Oxford University Press.
- Vynnyk, O. (2024). Professional ethics, medical experts and the famine of 1932–1933 in Soviet Ukraine. Journal of Genocide Research, 26(3), 264–285.
- Weiss-Wendt, A. (2005). Hostage of politics: Raphael Lemkin on "Soviet genocide". Journal of Genocide Research, 7(4), 551–559.
- Weiss-Wendt, A. (2017). The Soviet Union and the gutting of the UN Genocide Convention. University of Wisconsin Press.
- Wheatcroft, S. G. (2004). Towards explaining Soviet famine of 1931–3: Political and natural factors in perspective. Food and Foodways, 12(2–3), 107–136.
- Wheatcroft, S. G. (2018). The turn away from economic explanations for Soviet famines. Contemporary European History, 27(3), 465–469.
- Wheatcroft, S. G. (2019). Soviet statistics under Stalinism: Reliability and distortions in grain and population statistics. Europe-Asia Studies, 71(6), 1013–1035.
- Wolowyna, O., Plokhy, S., Levchuk, N., Rudnytskyi, O., Shevchuk, P., & Kovbasiuk, A. (2016). Regional variations of 1932–34 famine losses in Ukraine. Canadian Studies in Population, 43(3–4), 175–202.
- Wolowyna, O., Levchuk, N., & Kovbasiuk, A. (2020). Monthly distribution of 1933 famine losses in Soviet Ukraine and the Russian Soviet Republic at the regional level. Nationalities Papers, 48(3), 530–548.
- Wolowyna, O. (2021). A demographic framework for the 1932–1934 famine in the Soviet Union. Journal of Genocide Research, 23(4), 501–526.

== Literature and film ==
- Cherkasova, N. (2024). Mister Jones and the depiction of the Holodomor on the world screen. Studies in Russian and Soviet Cinema, 18(3), 327–344.
- Dietsch, J. (2006). Making sense of suffering: Holocaust and Holodomor in Ukrainian historical culture. Lund University.
- Holland, A. (Director). (2019). Mr. Jones [Film]. Film Produkcja; Kinorob; Jones Boy Film.
- Mendeluk, G. (Director). (2017). Bitter Harvest [Film]. Roadside Attractions.
- Nowytski, S. (Director). (1984). Harvest of despair: The 1932–33 man-made famine in Ukraine [Documentary film]. Ukrainian Famine Research Committee.
- Samchuk, U. (2011). Maria: A chronicle of a life (R. Franko, Trans.). Language Lanterns Publications. (Original work published 1934)
- Weretiuk, O. (2017). Irish and Ukrainian famines: Literary images, historical memory and aesthetic emotions. The Wenshan Review of Literature and Culture, 10(2), 51–68.

== Historiography and memory ==
- Andriewsky, O. (2015). Towards a decentred history: The study of the Holodomor and Ukrainian historiography. East/West: Journal of Ukrainian Studies, 2(1), 17–52. doi:10.21226/T2301N
- Bilinsky, Y. (1999). Was the Ukrainian famine of 1932–1933 genocide? Journal of Genocide Research, 1(2), 147–156. doi:10.1080/14623529908413948
- Davies, R. W., & Wheatcroft, S. G. (2006). Stalin and the Soviet famine of 1932–33: A reply to Ellman. Europe-Asia Studies, 58(4), 625–633. doi:10.1080/09668130600652217
- Ellman, M. (2005). The role of leadership perceptions and of intent in the Soviet famine of 1931–1934. Europe-Asia Studies, 57(6), 823–841. doi:10.1080/09668130500199392
- Ellman, M. (2007). Stalin and the Soviet famine of 1932–33 revisited. Europe-Asia Studies, 59(4), 663–693. doi:10.1080/09668130701291899
- Gorbunova, V., & Klymchuk, V. (2020). The psychological consequences of the Holodomor in Ukraine. East/West: Journal of Ukrainian Studies, 7(2), 33–68. doi:10.21226/ewjus609
- Graziosi, A. (2015). The impact of Holodomor studies on the understanding of the USSR. East/West: Journal of Ukrainian Studies, 2(1), 53–80. doi:10.21226/T2Z595
- Kasianov, G. (2012). Holodomor and the politics of memory in Ukraine after independence. In C. Noack, L. Janssen, & V. Comerford (Eds.), Holodomor and Gorta Mór: Histories, memories and representations of famine in Ukraine and Ireland (pp. 167–188). Anthem Press.
- Kasianov, G. (2022). Holodomor and the Holocaust in Ukraine as cultural memory: Comparison, competition, interaction. Journal of Genocide Research, 24(2), 216–227. doi:10.1080/14623528.2021.1968146
- Kasianov, G. (2022). Memory crash: The politics of history in and around Ukraine 1980s–2010s. Central European University Press.
- Koziura, K. (2025). Toward the transnational memory of Holodomor: The famine commemorative genre and the Ukrainian diaspora. Memory Studies, 18(1), 22–43. doi:10.1177/17506980241247270
- Kuromiya, H. (2008). The Soviet famine of 1932–1933 reconsidered. Europe-Asia Studies, 60(4), 663–675. doi:10.1080/09668130801999912
- Naimark, N. M. (2015). How the Holodomor can be integrated into our understanding of genocide. East/West: Journal of Ukrainian Studies, 2(1), 117–132. doi:10.21226/T2PP4Z
- Nefedov, S., & Ellman, M. (2019). The Soviet famine of 1931–1934: Genocide, a result of poor harvests, or the outcome of a conflict between the state and the peasants? Europe-Asia Studies, 71(6), 1048–1065. doi:10.1080/09668136.2019.1617464
- Shkandrij, M. (2012). Ukrainianization, terror and famine: Coverage in Lviv's Dilo and the nationalist press of the 1930s. Nationalities Papers, 40(3), 431–451. doi:10.1080/00905992.2012.674504
- Sysyn, F. (2015). Thirty years of research on the Holodomor: A balance sheet. East/West: Journal of Ukrainian Studies, 2(1), 3–16. doi:10.21226/T26P4M

=== Survivor memoirs and eyewitness accounts ===
- Borysenko, V. K. (2010). A candle in remembrance: An oral history of the Ukrainian genocide of 1932–1933. Ukrainian National Women's League of America.
- Dolot, M. (1984). Who killed them and why? In remembrance of those killed in the famine of 1932–1933 in Ukraine. Harvard University, Ukrainian Studies Fund.
- Dolot, M. (1985). Execution by hunger: The hidden holocaust. W. W. Norton.
- Kopelev, L. (1980). The education of a true believer (G. Kern, Trans.). Harper & Row.
- Kravchenko, V. (1946). I chose freedom: The personal and political life of a Soviet official. Charles Scribner's Sons.
- Mace, J. E., & Heretz, L. (Eds.). (1990). Investigation of the Ukrainian famine, 1932–1933: Oral history project of the Commission on the Ukraine Famine (Vols. 1–3). U.S. Government Printing Office.
- Makohon, P. (1983). Witness: Memoirs of the famine of 1933 in Ukraine (A. J. Motyl, Trans.). Anabasis Magazine.
- Ogiienko, V. (Ed.). (2022). The Holodomor and the origins of the Soviet man: Reading the testimony of Anastasia Lysyvets (A. Parkhomenko & A. J. Motyl, Trans.; Ukrainian Voices, Vol. 24). Ibidem-Verlag.
- Pidhainy, S. O. (Ed.). (1953–1955). The black deeds of the Kremlin: A white book (Vols. 1–2). Ukrainian Association of Victims of Russian Communist Terror.
- Pigido-Pravoberezhny, F. (1953). The Stalin famine: Ukraine in the year 1933 (M. Roberts, Trans.). Ukrainian Youth Association.
- Woropay, O. (1983). The ninth circle: In commemoration of the victims of the famine of 1933 (J. E. Mace, Ed.). Ukrainian Studies Fund, Harvard University.

== Primary sources and document collections ==
- Carynnyk, M., Luciuk, L. Y., & Kordan, B. S. (Eds.). (1988). The foreign office and the famine: British documents on Ukraine and the great famine of 1932–1933. Limestone Press.
- Davies, R. W., Khlevniuk, O. V., Rees, E. A., Kosheleva, L. P., & Rogovaya, L. A. (Eds.). (2003). The Stalin–Kaganovich correspondence, 1931–36 (S. Shabad, Trans.). Yale University Press.
- Lih, L. T., Naumov, O. V., & Khlevniuk, O. V. (Eds.). (1995). Stalin's letters to Molotov, 1925–1936 (C. A. Fitzpatrick, Trans.). Yale University Press.
- Pyrih, R. (Comp.). (2008). Holodomor of 1932–1933 in Ukraine: Documents and materials (S. Bandera, Trans.). Kyiv-Mohyla Academy Publishing House.
- Viola, L., Danilov, V. P., Ivnitskii, N. A., & Kozlov, D. (Eds.). (2005). The war against the peasantry, 1927–1930: The tragedy of the Soviet countryside (Vol. 1; S. Shabad, Trans.). Yale University Press.
- Commission on the Ukraine Famine. (1988). Investigation of the Ukrainian famine, 1932–1933: Report to Congress (J. E. Mace, Staff Director). U.S. Government Printing Office.

== Reference works ==
- Famine-genocide of 1932–3. (n.d.). In Internet encyclopedia of Ukraine. Canadian Institute of Ukrainian Studies. Retrieved July 20, 2026.
- Plokhy, S. (Dir.). (2013). MAPA: Digital atlas of Ukraine — The Great Famine project [Digital atlas]. Harvard Ukrainian Research Institute.
- Serbyn, R. (2005). Ukraine (Famine). In D. L. Shelton (Ed.), Encyclopedia of genocide and crimes against humanity. Macmillan Reference USA.
- Werth, N. (2008, April 18). The great Ukrainian famine of 1932–33. Online Encyclopedia of Mass Violence, Sciences Po.

== See also ==
- Bibliography of Stalinism and the Soviet Union
- Bibliography of the Asharshylyk (Kazakh famine of 1932–1933)
- Holodomor
- Holodomor denial
- Soviet famine of 1932–1933
- Kazakhstan famine of 1932–1933

== Sources ==
- Davies, R. W.; Wheatcroft, S. G. (2004). The Years of Hunger: Soviet Agriculture, 1931–1933. The Industrialisation of Soviet Russia, volume 5. Palgrave Macmillan.
