= Blacklisting (Soviet policy) =

Soviet Union monetary penalty

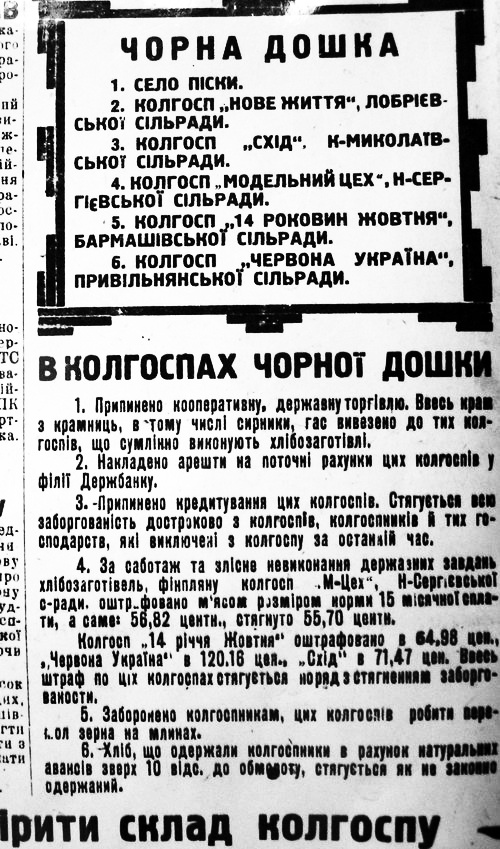
A "black board" published in the newspaper "Under the Flag of Lenin" in January 1933 — a "blacklist" identifying specific kolhozes and their punishment in Bashtanka Raion, Mykolayiv oblast, Ukraine.

Blacklisting, or the system of the chorna doshka (Ukrainian: чорна дошка, lit. 'black board') synonymous with a "board of infamy", was one of the elements of agitation-propaganda in the Soviet Union, and especially Ukraine and the Kuban region in the 1930s, and is considered as one of the instruments of the Holodomor. Blacklisting was also used in Soviet Kazakhstan. Eventually it transformed into a means of repression of peasants.

A blacklisted collective farm, village, or raion (district) had its monetary loans and grain advances called in, stores closed, grain supplies, livestock, and food confiscated as a "penalty", and was cut off from trade. Its Communist Party and collective farm committees were purged and subject to arrest, and their territory was forcibly cordoned off by the OGPU secret police. Although nominally targeting collective farms failing to meet grain quotas and independent farmers with outstanding tax-in-kind, in practice the punishment was applied to all residents of affected villages and raions, including teachers, tradespeople, and children.

== Origin of the term ==
The term "black board" was in use in schools of the Russian Empire: the names of exceptionally bad students were listed on a Black Board, and the names of exceptionally good students were listed on the Red Board.

== History ==
The blacklist system was formalized in 1932 by the November 20 decree "The Struggle against Kurkul Influence in Collective Farms", and supplemented in January 1933 by Stalin's "Preventing the Mass Exodus of Peasants who are Starving," banning travel by peasants from affected regions in Ukraine and the Kuban. The blacklist policy was part of the collectivization process and the fight with kulaks (kurkuls). The "black boards" were installed at entrances to a settlement and identified the residents that were accused of counter-revolutionary activity and who were labelled enemies of the people, allegedly trying to undermine the process of collectivization. The fact of nominating of such settlements was published in the oblast newspapers listing the names of collective farms that resisted collectivization and the Soviet regime.

However some of the archives reflect that "black boards" were used precisely as a repressive element in the fight not only against the collectivization resistance, but also against the nationality factor of the local population. For example, in 1932 the Vinnytsia Oblast Communist Party Committee suggested the local village of Mazurivka to be nominated to "black boards", because there was born one of Symon Petliura's generals Khmara, while the village of Karpivtsi (Chudniv Raion) in Volyn was known as one of the Petliura's. The village of Turbiv (Lypovets Raion), for example, deserved such a penalty for its "high infestation of the Petlyura element and participation in the Plyskiv affair in spring". Each settlement or an administrative unit with black boards was encircled by armed squads and was subjected to complete food requisitioning.

In the end 37 out of 392 districts along with at least 400 collective farms where put on the "black board" in Ukraine, more than half of the blacklisted farms being in Dnipropetrovsk Oblast alone. Every single raion in Dnipropetrovsk had at least one blacklisted village, and in Vinnytsia oblast five entire raions were blacklisted. This oblast is situated right in the middle of traditional lands of the Zaporizhian Cossacks. Cossack villages were also blacklisted in the Volga and Kuban regions of Russia. In 1932, 32 (out of less than 200) districts in Kazakhstan that did not meet grain production quotas were blacklisted. Some blacklisted areas in Kharkiv could have death rates exceeding 40% while in other areas such as Vinnytsia blacklisting had no particular effect on mortality. The only blacklisted district in the Stalino oblast had a mortality rate that was roughly 2 to 3 times higher than most of the oblast with only 2 districts in the oblast having a comparable death rate.

== See also ==
- Category:Blackboard places
