= Stephen G. Wheatcroft =

Australian historian (born 1947)

Stephen George Wheatcroft FASSA (born 1 June 1947) is a Professorial Fellow of the School of Historical Studies at the University of Melbourne. His research interests include Russian pre-revolutionary and Soviet social, economic and demographic history, as well as famine and food supply problems in modern world history, the impact of media on history, and in recent developments in Russian and Ukrainian society. Wheatcroft speaks Russian fluently and has spent a good portion of his career researching in the Soviet archives, and he played a major role in publishing materials from the archives.

Wheatcroft was named a fellow of the Academy of the Social Sciences in Australia in 2005.

== Selected works ==
=== Books ===
- Davies, R. W.; Harrison, Mark; Wheatcroft, S. G. (1994). The Economic Transformation of the Soviet Union, 1913–1945. Cambridge University Press. ISBN 978-0-521-45152-9.
- (co-editor; publication of archival materials) The Tragedy of the Soviet Village, 1927–1939 2001 in Russian
- Wheatcroft, S. G., ed. (2002). Challenging Traditional Views of Russian History. Palgrave Macmillan. ISBN 978-0333754610.
- Davies, R. W.; Wheatcroft, S. G. (2004). The Industrialisation of Soviet Russia Volume 5: The Years of Hunger: Soviet Agriculture 1931–1933. Palgrave Macmillan. ISBN 978-0-230-23855-8.

=== Articles ===
- Wheatcroft, S. G. (1990). "More light on the scale of repression and excess mortality in the Soviet Union in the 1930s" (PDF). Soviet Studies. 42 (2): 355–367. doi:10.1080/09668139008411872. JSTOR 152086.
- Davies, R. W.; Tauger, M. B.; Wheatcroft, S. G. (1995). "Stalin, Grain Stocks and the Famine of 1932–1933" (PDF). Slavic Review. 54 (3): 642–657. doi:10.2307/2501740. JSTOR 2501740. S2CID 163790684.
- Wheatcroft, S. G. (1996). "The Scale and Nature of German and Soviet Repression and Mass Killings, 1930–45" (PDF). Europe-Asia Studies. 48 (8): 1319–1353. doi:10.1080/09668139608412415. JSTOR 152781.
- Wheatcroft, S. G. (1997). "A Further Note of Clarification on the Famine, the Camps and Excess Mortality" (PDF). Europe–Asia Studies. 49 (3): 503–505. doi:10.1080/09668139708412456.
- Wheatcroft, S. G. (1999). "Victims of Stalinism and the Soviet Secret Police: The Comparability and Reliability of the Archival Data. Not the Last Word" (PDF). Europe–Asia Studies. 51 (2): 315–345. doi:10.1080/09668139999056.
- Wheatcroft, S. G. (2000). "The Scale and Nature of Stalinist Repression and its Demographic Significance: On Comments by Keep and Conquest" (PDF). Europe–Asia Studies. 52 (6): 1143–1159. doi:10.1080/09668130050143860. PMID 19326595. S2CID 205667754.
- Wheatcroft, S. G. (2004). "Towards Explaining the Soviet Famine of 1931–1933: Political and Natural Factors in Perspective". Food and Foodways. 12 (2–3): 107–136. doi:10.1080/07409710490491447. S2CID 155003439.
- Davies, R. W.; Wheatcroft, S. G. (2006). "Stalin and the Soviet Famine of 1932–1933: A Reply to Ellman" (PDF). Europe-Asia Studies. 58 (4): 625–633. doi:10.1080/09668130600652217. S2CID 145729808.
- Wheatcroft, Stephen (2018). "The Turn Away from Economic Explanations for Soviet Famines". Contemporary European History. 27 (3): 465–469. doi:10.1017/S0960777318000358. hdl:10536/DRO/DU:30116832.
