= James Mace =

American historian (1952–2004)

James Ernest Mace
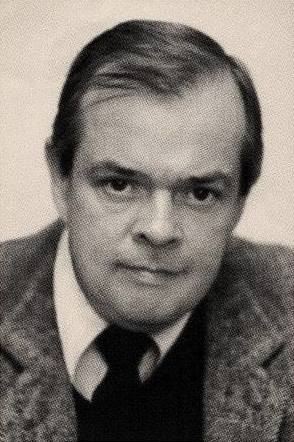
- Born: February 18, 1952; Muskogee, Oklahoma, U.S.
- Died: May 3, 2004 (aged 52); Kyiv, Ukraine
- Occupation: Historian
- Known for: Researching the Holodomor
- Spouse: Natalia Dziubenko-Mace

James E. Mace (February 18, 1952 – May 3, 2004) was an American historian, professor, and researcher of the Holodomor.

== Biography ==
Born in Muscogee, Oklahoma, Mace did his undergraduate studies at the Oklahoma State University, graduating with a B.A. in history in 1973. He pursued his graduate studies at the University of Michigan, where he studied with Roman Szporluk, receiving a Ph.D. degree in 1981, with a thesis on national communism in Soviet Ukraine in the 1920s.

=== In Harvard ===
In 1981, at the invitation of Omeljan Pritsak, Mace began working at the Harvard Ukrainian Research Institute of Harvard University, first as a postdoctoral fellow, later as a participant in the project to study the Famine in Ukraine, a visiting professor at the Harvard Summer School, and director of the pilot project Oral History of the Ukrainian Holodomor. During 1984-1986 he was a research associate.

In 1983, the Harvard Series of Ukrainian Studies published James Mace's monograph Communism and the Dilemmas of National Liberation: National Communism in Soviet Ukraine, 1918—1933.

Until 1986, he worked as Robert Conquest's assistant on the book The Harvest of Sorrow on the Great Famine in Ukraine.

=== Commission on the Ukraine Famine ===
From 1986 to 1990, Mace served as the executive director of the U.S. Commission on the Ukraine Famine, in Washington, D.C. The result of the commission's work was a report to the US Congress published in 1988 and a three-volume set of 204 testimonies about the famine of 1932–1933 in 1990. The conclusions of the report, in particular, stated that Joseph Stalin and his people committed genocide against Ukrainians in 1932–1933. Also, the commission organized public hearings in seven US states, during which 57 witnesses of the famine of 1932-1933 spoke.

=== Moving to Ukraine ===
Mace visited Ukraine for the first time in 1990 at the invitation of the Ukraine society to participate in the events dedicated to the Holodomor. It was at this time that the resolution of the Central Committee of the Communist Party of Ukraine was published on January 26, 1990 On the famine of 1932-1933 in Ukraine and the publication of archival materials related to it.

In the early 1990s, he had temporary employment at American universities and was looking for a permanent job. In particular, in 1990-1991 he was a research associate of the program for the study of the nations of Siberia in Harriman Institute of Soviet Studies at Columbia University. In 1991–1993, he was a researcher at the Ukrainian Research Program of the University of Illinois, and in 1993–1994, he was a consultant to the Ukraine project of the Institute for American Pluralism.

In 1993 he moved from the United States to Ukraine. Since 1995, he was a professor of Political Science at the National University of Kyiv-Mohyla Academy.

He wrote a regular column for the Kyiv newspaper Den and articles for other Ukrainian periodicals.

In 2003 Mace initiated a campaign later called Candle in the Window: lighting the candles in the windows of homes throughout the world on the national day of remembrance for the victims of 1933, given that every Ukrainian, almost every family lost a loved one.

Mace died in Kyiv, aged 52. He is survived by his wife, Natalia Dziubenko-Mace, one son from a previous marriage, William, and two adult stepchildren. The Order of Yaroslav Mudry, 2nd Class was awarded posthumously to Mace by President Viktor Yushchenko, in 2005. A monument in his memory was scheduled to be established in Kyiv in 2008.

== Commemoration ==
Streets in the Ukrainian cities of Kyiv, Brovary, Dnipro and Vinnytsia have been renamed after James Mace.

== Publications ==
- Communism and the Dilemmas of National Liberation: National Communism in Soviet Ukraine, 1918—1933. Harvard Series in Ukrainian Studies, Cambridge, 1983.
  - Edition in Ukrainian: Комунізм та дилеми національного визволення: національний комунізм у радянській Україні, 1918—1933 / з англ. пер. Максим Яковлєв. Київ: Комора, 2018.
- In assistance with Conquest: Robert Conquest. The Harvest of Sorrow: Soviet Collectivization and the Terror-Famine. New York: Oxford University Press, 1986.
  - Edition in Russian: Роберт Конквест. Жатва скорби: советская коллективизация и террор голодом / пер. с англ. И. Коэн, Н. Май‒ London: Overseas Publications Interchange Ltd, 1988. ‒ 620 с.
  - Editions in Ukrainian: Роберт Конквест. Жнива скорботи: радянська колективізація і Голодомор [Архівовано 10 лютого 2022 у Wayback Machine.] / Гол. редактор С. Головко— Київ: Либідь, 1993.; Роберт Конквест. Жнива скорботи: радянська колективізація і голодомор / пер. з англ. Н. Волошинович, З. Корабліної, В. Новак. — Луцьк: Терен, 2007. — 454 с.
- Commission on the Ukrainian Famine. Oral History Project / Ed. J. E. Mace, L. Heretz. ‒ Washington: US Government Printing Office, Washington, 1990. ‒ Volume I—III;
- Collection of articles published posthumously: Day and eternity of James Mace / ed. L. Ivshyna. Kyiv: Ukrainian press group, 2005.
- Articles
  - Genocide in the Ukraine: Its Secret Belongs to Humanity. Los Angeles Times. August 14, 1986.
  - Politics and History in Soviet Ukraine, 1921–1933. Nationalities Papers. 1982. X: 2, Fall.
  - The Komitety Nezamozhnykh Selyan and the Structure of Soviet Rule in the Ukrainian Countryside. Soviet Studies. 1983. XXV: 4.
  - The Man-Made Famine of 1932—1933: What Happened and Why. The Great Man-Made Famine in Ukraine, ed. Ukrainian Weekly. Svoboda Press, Jersey City, 1983.
  - Famine and Nationalism in Soviet Ukraine. Problems of Communism. ‒ 1984. ‒ May–June.
  - The Politics of Famine: American Government and Press Responses to the Ukrainian Famine, 1932—1933 [Архівовано 4 листопада 2021 у Wayback Machine.]. Holocaust and Genocide Studies (Jerusalem). 1988. III:1, April.
