= Soviet famine of 1946–1947 in Ukraine =

The Soviet famine of 1946–1947 in Ukraine was a major famine in Soviet Ukraine from 1946 to 1947 caused by forced export of grain and foodstuffs to other republics of the Soviet Union and to allied countries, part of the Soviet famine of 1946–1947. For example, 350 thousand tons of grain were exported from the USSR to Romania in 1946, 600 thousand tons of grain to Czechoslovakia in 1947, and 900 thousand tons of bread were exported to Poland throughout 1946 and 1947. Famine was spreading rapidly in the Moldavian SSR and the southern regions of the Ukrainian SSR, and in the first half of 1947 alone, 130 cases of human cannibalism were officially registered.
