= United States Commission on the Ukraine Famine =

Former United States government commission

The United States Commission on the Ukraine Famine was a commission to study the Holodomor, a 1932–1933 man-made famine that killed millions in Ukraine.

The Commission's final report to Congress concluded that the man-made famine was an act of genocide against the people of Ukraine carried out by the Soviets.

== Conduct ==
The commission was set up by Senate resolution S2458 (98th Congress) on September 21, 1984. The 99th Congress, on January 3, 1985, passed appropriations to fund the Famine Commission and on April 23, 1986, the Commission held its organizational meeting at the Rayburn House Office Building "to conduct a study of the 1932–33 Ukrainian Famine in order to expand the world’s knowledge of the famine and provide the American public with a better understanding of the Soviet system by revealing the Soviet role". Its findings were delivered to the US Congress on April 22, 1988.

At its final meeting on April 19, 1986, Commissioner Ulana Mazurkevich condemned the actions of Walter Duranty, who knowingly sent out false dispatches about the famine to The New York Times.

The Soviets tried to establish a kind of counter-commission in the Ukrainian SSR. The Ukrainian Communist Party's First Secretary Volodymyr Shcherbytsky gave scholars access to official archives in order to support official denial of the famine as a fascist slander. The scholars instead found accounts of government decisions, food confiscation, protest, mass death, and cannibalism, and concluded that the famine had been undeniably real. The Ukrainian Communist Party's Central Committee passed a resolution on 7 February 1990, calling the famine a result of the "criminal course pursued by Stalin and his closest entourage toward the peasantry".

== Members and staff ==
- Congressman Daniel A. Mica, (D-FL), Chairman
- Gary L. Bauer, Assistant to the President for Policy Development
- Congressman William Broomfield, (R-MI)
- Senator Dennis DeConcini (D-AZ)
- Ambassador H. Eugene Douglas, Lyndon Baines Johnson School of Government, University of Texas, Austin
- Bohdan Fedorak, Public Member
- Congressman Benjamin Gilman, (R-NY)
- Congressman Dennis Hertel, (D-MI)
- Sen. Robert Kasten (R-WI)
- Surgeon General C. Everett Koop
- Dr. Myron Kuropas, Public Member
- Daniel Marchishin, Public Member
- Ulana Mazurkevich, Public Member
- Anastasia Volker, Public Member
- Dr. Oleh Weres, Public Member

=== Staff of the Commission on the Ukraine Famine ===
- Dr. James E. Mace, Staff Director
- Dr. Olga Samilenko, Staff Assistant
- Walter Pechenuk, Staff Assistant

== Duties ==
1. to study the Famine by gathering all available information about the Famine, analyzing its causes and consequences, and studying the reaction of the free world to the Famine;
2. to provide interim reports to Congress;
3. to provide information about the Famine to Congress, the executive branch, educational institutions, libraries, the news media, and the general public;
4. to submit a final report to Congress on or before April 23, 1988; and
5. to terminate 60 days thereafter.

== Findings ==
Based on testimony heard and staff research, the Commission on Ukraine Famine makes the following findings:

1. There is no doubt that large numbers of inhabitants of the Ukrainian SSR and the North Caucasus Territory starved to death in a man-made famine in 1932-1933, caused by the seizure of the 1932 crop by Soviet authorities.
2. The victims of the Ukrainian Famine numbered in the millions.
3. Official Soviet allegations of "kulak sabotage," upon which all "difficulties" were blamed during the Famine, are false.
4. The Famine was not, as is often alleged, related to drought.
5. In 1931-1932, the official Soviet response to a drought-induced grain shortage outside Ukraine was to send aid to the areas affected and to make a series of concessions to the peasantry.
6. In mid-1932, following complaints by officials in the Ukrainian SSR that excessive grain procurements had led to localized outbreaks of famine, Moscow reversed course and took an increasingly hard line toward the peasantry.
7. The inability of Soviet authorities in Ukraine to meet the grain procurements quota forced them to introduce increasingly severe measures to extract the maximum quantity of grain from the peasants.
8. In the fall of 1932, Stalin used the resulting "procurements crisis" in Ukraine as an excuse to tighten his control in Ukraine and to intensify grain seizures further.
9. The Ukrainian Famine of 1932-1933 was caused by the maximum extraction of agricultural produce from the rural population.
10. Officials in charge of grain seizures also lived in fear of punishment.
11. Stalin knew that people were starving to death in Ukraine by late 1932.
12. In January 1933, Stalin used the "laxity" of the Ukrainian authorities in seizing grain to strengthen further his control over the Communist Party of Ukraine and mandated actions which worsened the situation and maximized the loss of life.
13. Postyshev had a dual mandate from Moscow: to intensify the grain seizures (and therefore the Famine) in Ukraine and to eliminate such modest national self-assertion as Ukrainians had hitherto been allowed by the USSR.
14. While famine also took place during the 1932-1933 agricultural year in the Volga Basin and the North Caucasus Territory as a whole, the invasiveness of Stalin's interventions of both the fall of 1932 and January 1933 in Ukraine are parallelled only in the ethnically Ukrainian Kuban region of the North Caucasus.
15. Attempts were made to prevent the starving from traveling to areas where food was more available.
16. Joseph Stalin and those around him committed genocide against Ukrainians in 1932-1933.
17. The American government had ample and timely information about the Famine but failed to take any steps which might have ameliorated the situation. Instead, the Administration extended diplomatic recognition to the Soviet government in November 1933, immediately after the Famine.
18. During the Famine certain members of the American press corps cooperated with the Soviet government to deny the existence of the Ukrainian Famine.
19. Recently, scholarship in both the West and, to a lesser extent, the Soviet Union has made substantial progress in dealing with the Famine. Although official Soviet historians and spokesmen have never given a fully accurate or adequate account, significant progress has been made in recent months.
