= Winter garden =

Kind of garden maintained in wintertime

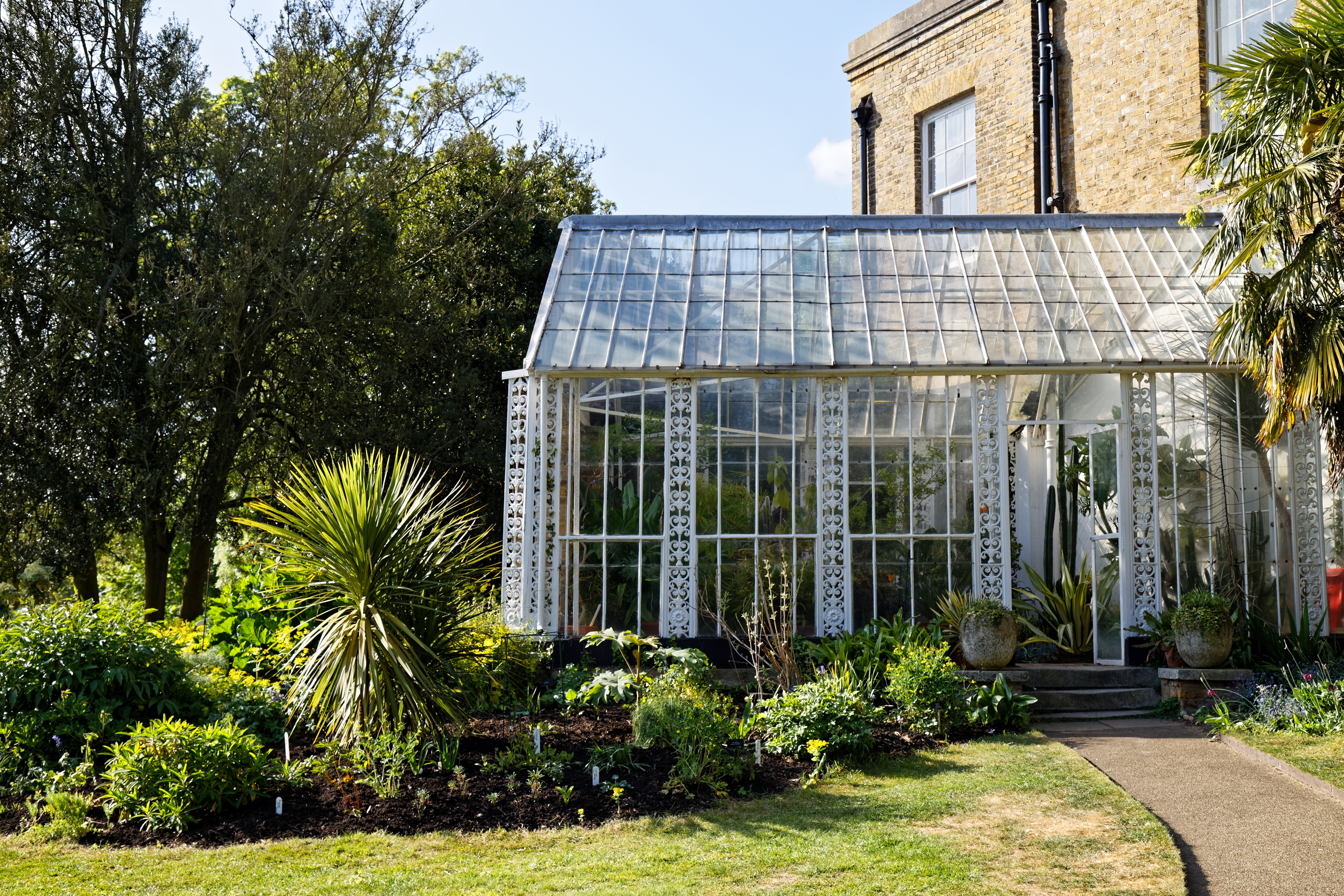
Winter garden at Myddelton House, London Borough of Enfield, England

A winter garden is a kind of garden maintained in wintertime.

== History ==
The origin of the winter garden dates back to the 17th to 19th centuries where European nobility constructed large conservatories that housed tropical and subtropical plants and acted as an extension of their living space. Many of these were attached to their main palaces. Earlier versions were constructed of masonry with large windows and a glass roof, usually in the Classical or Gothic styles. While in the 19th century many of these conservatories were made out of iron and curvilinear glass.

Winter gardens were not just restricted to private residence; many were built for the greater public. The first large public winter garden was built in 1842–1846 in Regent's Park, and was used for evening occasions, large flower shows and social gatherings. Other winter gardens, such as the Crystal Palace by Sir Joseph Paxton in 1851, were soon built and used for a variety of purposes.

== Present ==
The modern winter garden is usually a garden planted either to produce food, or at least to remain visibly planted and slowly develop, throughout the winter, or else a garden whose plants will serve as living decoration all winter. One basic premise to the winter garden in temperate or colder regions is that the plants may become dormant when snow covers the ground, but will grow each time the sun heats at least part of the plant to above freezing temperature, even if there is snow. This is especially the case in regions where snow cover and below-freezing temperatures are not constant for months at a time.

Common winter garden vegetables include:

- Several breeds of winter-hardy cabbage
- Specific winter-hardy breeds of broccoli
- Winter rye is grown where a summer garden will be, in order to protect the ground from weeds, and provide soil amendment when tilled directly into the soil the following spring
- Beets
- Carrots
- Alliums—onions, chives, and their relatives are evergreen, though some may die back during the winter and recover in the spring.
- Oregano (including marjoram) -- known to hardily survive the winter up to Zone 5

== See also ==
- Greenhouse
- Hardiness zone
- Winter sowing
- Polytunnel
