= Spikelet =

Part of a spike inflorescence of a grass or sedge

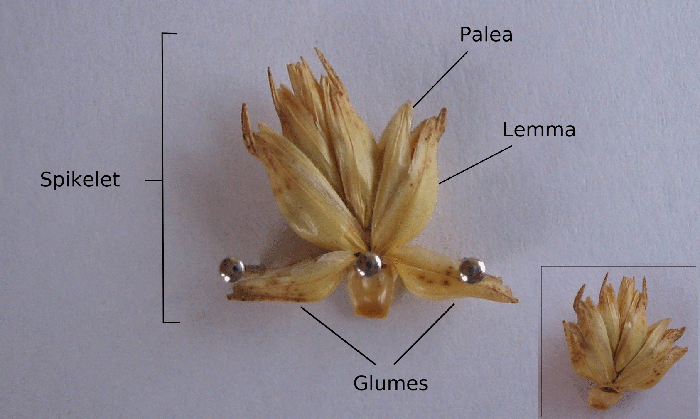
Parts of a single grass spikelet, consisting of two glumes, four fertile florets, with one additional central floret that may or may not be sterile

A spikelet, in botany, describes the typical arrangement of the inflorescences of grasses, sedges and some other monocots.

Each spikelet has one or more florets. The spikelets are further grouped into panicles or spikes. The part of the spikelet that bears the florets is called the rachilla.

== In grasses ==
In Poaceae, the grass family, a spikelet consists of two (or sometimes fewer) bracts at the base, called glumes, followed by one or more florets. A floret consists of the flower (consisting of an ovary, two stigmas, and three anthers) surrounded by two bracts, one external (the lemma) and one internal (the palea). The perianth is reduced to two scales, called lodicules, that expand and contract to spread the lemma and palea; these are generally interpreted to be modified sepals. When threshed, the lemma and palea of most species of oat stay bonded to the seed.

The flowers are usually hermaphroditic — maize being an important exception — and mainly anemophilous or wind-pollinated, although insects occasionally play a role. The market grade of an oat crop is based on the color of the lemma, whether it be white, gray, yellow, brown, black, or red.

=== Lemma ===
Lemma is a phytomorphological term referring to a part of the spikelet. It is the lowermost of two chaff-like bracts enclosing the grass floret. The lemma often bears a long bristle called an awn, and may be similar in form to the glumes, which are chaffy bracts at the base of each spikelet. It is usually interpreted as a bract but it has also been interpreted as one remnant (the abaxial) of the three members of outer perianth whorl (the palea may represent the other two members, having been joined together).

The lemmas' shape, their number of veins, whether they are awned or not, and the presence or absence of hairs are particularly important characters in grass taxonomy.

=== Palea ===
Palea, in Poaceae, refers to one of the bract-like organs in the spikelet.

The palea is the uppermost of the two chaff-like bracts that enclose the grass floret (the other being the lemma). It is often cleft at the tip, implying that it may be a double structure derived from the union of two separate organs. This has led to suggestions that it may be what remains of the grass sepals (outer perianth whorl): specifically the two adaxial members of the three membered whorl typical of monocots. The third member may be absent or it may be represented by the lemma, according to different botanical interpretations.

The perianth interpretation of the palea is supported by the expression of MADS-box genes in this organ during development, as is the case in sepals of eudicot plants.

=== Lodicule ===
A lodicule is the structure that consists of between one and three small scales at the base of the ovary in a grass flower that represent the corolla, believed to be a rudimentary perianth. The swelling of the lodicules forces apart the flower's bracts, exposing the flower's reproductive organs.

== See also ==
- Law of Spikelets
