= Law of Spikelets =

1932 Soviet decree on theft of grain from collective farms

The Law of Spikelets or Law of Three Spikelets (Russian: Закон о трёх колосках, Закон о пяти колосках, Закон семь-восемь) was a decree in the Soviet Union to protect state property of kolkhozes (Soviet collective farms)—especially the grain they produced—from theft, largely by desperate peasants during the Soviet famine of 1932–33. The decree was also known as the "Seven Eighths Law" (Закон 'семь восьмых', Zakon "sem' vos'mykh"), because the date in Russian is filled into forms as 7/8/1932 (7 August 1932). The law provided a severe punishment for stolen collective and cooperative property: "execution with confiscation of all property and replacement in mitigating circumstances with imprisonment for at least 10 years with confiscation of all property." Amnesty was prohibited in these cases.

Although the formal name of the law was longer, the common names Law of Spikelets and Law of Three Spikelets came into use because of the article and brochure of Prosecutor General A. Vyshinsky (1933), where he condemned the practice to prosecute both corrupt officials and also those who gleaned the grains (or spikelets) left behind in the fields after the entire harvest was officially collected and counted. The decree was accepted and harshly applied during the Soviet famine of 1932–33. In 1936 the cases of the application of the law were reconsidered and over 60% of the convicted were released. (1936: 118,360 inmates; 1937: 44,409 inmates)

== Basis of decree ==
The decree of the All-Union Central Executive Committee and the All-Union Council of People's Commissars, "About protection of the property of state enterprises, kolkhozes and cooperatives, and strengthening of the public (socialist) property", is dated on 7 August 1932. Before it the prosecution for theft of state or cooperative property was formal and didn't exceed 2–5 years of prison or community work, which wasn't a barrier for mass thefts of foodstuff and property, especially in kolkhozes. The Soviet state intended to stop it with increased penalties and even death for especially grave crimes against people and state.

- The preamble stated that the communal property (state, kolkhoz, or cooperative property) is fundamental for the Soviet social order, therefore people who try to appropriate it must be treated as enemies of the people and socialist rule.
- Section I covers theft at railways and of water communications.
- Section II covers theft of kolkhoz and cooperative property.
- Section III of the law covers violence, threats and intimidation of kolkhozniks. The punishment was 5 to 10 years of concentration camp time.

The highest punishment for theft according to this decree was execution by shooting. Under extenuating circumstances, the punishment was at least 10 years of imprisonment. In all cases convicts' personal property was to be confiscated. Convicts for crimes covered by this decree were not subject to amnesty. The law was signed by Mikhail Kalinin, Vyacheslav Molotov and Avel Enukidze.

The accompanying "Instruction on the Application of the Decree of 7/8/1932" (September 1932) detailed that the death sentence was to be applied with respect to organised and systematic theft, to theft accompanied with arson and other destruction. The death sentence was also applied (albeit with provisions for extenuating circumstances in some crimes) "with respect to "kulaks, former merchants and other socially alien elements" who:

- were "working in "state enterprises or institutions"
- were "exposed in the theft of goods or selling them to the private market and embezzlement of large sums of money"
- had "penetrated the collective farm and those who are outside the collective farm and who organize or take part in the theft of collective farm property and bread"

Ordinary kolkhosniks and non-collectivised peasants (edinolichniks), as well as minor theft on transport, was to be punished with 10 years of imprisonment or less.

== Practice ==
In the first half of the year after the announcement of the decree, (by January 1, 1933) 150,000 people were convicted on it in the RSFSR; 3.5% of them (782) were sentenced to death. The railroad transport courts (Russian: линейный транспортный суд) (812 sentences in the USSR) and military tribunals (208 sentences for the USSR) also handed down death sentences, but the majority was discharged by highest courts. 60.3% of the defendants were convicted to 10 years in prison, and 36.2% for periods of less than 10 years. With regard to the latter category, 80% of the defendants received punishments not connected with deprivation of liberty.

With the growing social tension due to famine, the number of those convicted in these cases in the RSFSR in the first half of 1933 reached 69,523 people, who mostly (84.5%) were sentenced to 10 years in prison. For every tenth case, a lighter sentence was imposed, and 5.4 per cent of the perpetrators were sentenced to death on cases, when the theft was committed in an organized group and hundreds of tons.

By the spring of 1933 after the decision of the Politburo of the CPSU on February 1 and the decision of the Presidium of the CEC on March 27, 1933, quantity of convictions by decree went down, in the second half of the year halved, and the following year as a whole three times less compared with 1933. Two years later, only 6,706 sentences were handed down (1935). The situation in the Ukrainian SSR was similar: 12,767 convicted in 1933, 730 people — in 1935.

== Amnesty ==
On July 26, 1935, the Politburo decided for expungement of kolkhozniks convicted wrongfully on the basis of decree.

A year later the Prosecutor General of the USSR Vyshinsky prepared a memo addressed to Stalin, Molotov and Kalinin (July 20, 1936), that the review of cases on the basis of decree was completed. In total, more than 115,000 cases were checked, and in more than 91,000 cases (79%) the application of the decree of August 7 was recognized as incorrect, and on this basis 37,425 people were released or amnestied.

It has been estimated that more than 200,000 people were charged by the OGPU, and there were 181,827 sentences in 1932-1939 (normally of 5–10 years in Gulag prison), of which less than 1,000 in 1932 and 3,754 in 1933 seem to have been death sentences. For comparison, according to the report of the Judicial Department at the Supreme Court of the Russian Federation for the first half of 2017, 127,113 people were convicted of property crimes, including for embezzlement (article 160 of the criminal code) 3,903 people, destruction or damage to property (article 167) - 1880 people.
