= Mykhailo Volobuiev =

- Born: 11 (24) January 1903; Mykolaiv
- Died: 20 June 1972; Rostov-on-Don
- Citizenship: Soviet Union
- Education: National University of Kharkiv
- Known for: National communism, criticism of planned economy, criticism of imperialism and Russian chauvinism
- Children: Natalia Volobuieva
- Scientific career
- Fields: Economics

Mykhailo Symonovych Volobuiev (11 (24) January 1903, Mykolaiv — 20 June 1972, Rostov-on-Don) was a Ukrainian economist of the 1930s. He was a researcher at the Research Institute of the Ukrainian Academy of Sciences in Kharkiv and a major contributing thinker and advocate for the economic self-sufficiency of the Ukrainian Soviet Socialist Republic.

== Biography ==
Mykhailo Volobuiev was born in Mykolaiv. He studied at the gymnasium and graduated from the economics department of the University of Kharkiv.

From 1921 to 1922, he worked as deputy head of the Mykolayiv Provincial Department of Education, and in 1922 as deputy head of the Vinnytsia Department.

From 1923, he worked in Kharkiv at the Central Administration for Political Education and taught at the Kharkiv Pharmaceutical Technical School, the Kharkiv Institute of People's Education, and the Financial and Economic Technical School. Later, he became a professor of political economy at the Kharkiv Mechanical and Machine-Building Institute (1930—1933 — head of the department).

== Views ==
In 1928, Volobuiev's article (submitted to the editorial office in 1927) entitled "On the Problem of the Ukrainian Economy" was published in the "Bolshevik of Ukraine" (Bil’shovyk Ukraïny) magazine, the main theoretical journal of the Communist Party of Ukraine. The article outlined what Volobuiev considered the phases of development of the tsar's colonial policy in Ukraine before the events of October 1917 and refuted the version of the complete unity of the pre-revolutionary Russian economy. According to Volobuiev, this economy was united on an antagonistic imperialist basis, but, in terms of the centrifugal forces of the colonies oppressed by it, it was a complex of national economies. According to Volobuiev, the only economic complex was Ukraine, which was ignored by both Russian economists and Moscow governing bodies (including the USSR State Plan), which generally avoided even the name "Ukraine", preferring the terms "South", "Southern District", " South-West ", "South of European Russia ", "South-Russian economy", considering Ukraine a colony of the European type, which became part of the USSR. Volobuiev stated that Ukraine has all the hallmarks of a Russian colony and is economically exploited by it. Therefore, he argued that Russian imperialism combined with Russian chauvinism and central control of the economy resulted in exploitation colonialism of Ukraine.

Volobuiev argued that Ukraine had the right to control its economic development and its national budget. Thus, it had its own paths of development and that it must prepare for joining the world economy in the case of a victory of the revolution "not only in the former Russia, but throughout the globe" as an equal part of this world complex.

=== Reaction ===
His views gained wide support in Ukraine, and later, this line of thought was named Volobuievism. At the same time, his statements were attacked by Party authorities as ‘bourgeois nationalist’ and anti-Soviet. Consequently, he was forced to recant of his ideas. For this purpose, he wrote a letter to Komunist magazine (1928) and a two-part article in "Bolshevik of Ukraine" (Bil’shovyk Ukraïny) (1930) titled "Against the Economic Platform of Nationalism [Toward a Criticism of Volobuievism]'.

On 7 December 1933, Volobuiev was arrested on charges of participating in a "Ukrainian counterrevolutionary organization that sought to overthrow the Soviet government by force." During the interrogation, he “confessed” that he had been recruited by Mykola Khvylovy to a “counterrevolutionary Ukrainian organization”. By the decision of the three judges at the Board of the GPU of the USSR of 8 May 1934, Volobuiev was sentenced in a concentration camp for 5 years (the sentence was commuted to exile in Kazakhstan). However, he was not released until ten years later in 1943. After serving his term, he lived in the Krasnodar Territory.

In 1957, he was rehabilitated. He was eventually hired by the Economics and Trade Institute in Donetsk in 1961, where he worked for several years.
