= Winter sowing =

Agriculture planting strategy

Winter sowing is a method of starting seeds outdoors in winter. This is generally done with seeds that require a period of cold stratification. The method takes advantage of natural temperatures, rather than artificially refrigerating seeds.

Winter sowing involves sowing seeds in a miniature greenhouse outside during winter, allowing them to germinate in spring. Users of this method have had success in most hardiness zones.

== Advantages ==
There are many advantages to winter sowing:

- It is simple to do.
- It's efficient. You do not have to run grow lights for weeks at a time when starting seeds indoors.
- You don't need to worry about having leggy seedlings because they are planted and grown outdoors.
- There is no need to harden off the seedlings as they are already acclimated to outdoor conditions. They are ready to plant whenever the outside temperature has sufficiently warmed.
- Saves space indoors for plants that need to be started prior to planting outside.
- It allows someone who doesn't have the room, a grow light setup, nor the window space available indoors to start seeds successfully.
- Prevents seeds from being washed away or eaten.
- It gives you something to do gardening-wise during winter/early spring.

== Containers for winter sowing ==
Anything that is translucent enough to allow light to pass through and that can be made to have drainage holes, a lid, and a ventilation hole(s) can be used for winter sowing. Options include, but are not limited to, plastic jugs, water or soda bottles, take out containers, disposable foil pans with plastic covers, clamshell containers, disposable beverage cups, plastic tubs, and plastic totes.
