= Collectivization in the Ukrainian Soviet Socialist Republic =

Collectivization in Ukraine during the period when it was part of the Soviet Union, and was officially called the Ukrainian Soviet Socialist Republic, was part of the policy of collectivization in the USSR and dekulakization. It was pursued between 1928 and 1933 with the purpose to consolidate individual land and labour into collective farms called kolkhoz and to eliminate enemies of the working class. The idea of collective farms was seen by peasants as a revival of serfdom.

The policies had a dramatic effect on the Ukrainian ethnic population and its culture, as 86% of the population lived in rural settings. Their forceful implementation was one of the main causes of the Holodomor. In Ukraine, collectivization had specific goals and outcomes.

The formation of collective farms were based on the large village farms in collective ownership of village inhabitants. Estimated yields were expected to increase by 150%. The ultimate goal of collectivization was to resolve "grain problems" of the late 1920s.

In the early 1920s only 3% of the peasantry of the Soviet Union were collectivised. Within the first five-year plan 20% of peasant households were to be collectivised, although in Ukraine the number was set at 30%.

== Policy of collectivization ==
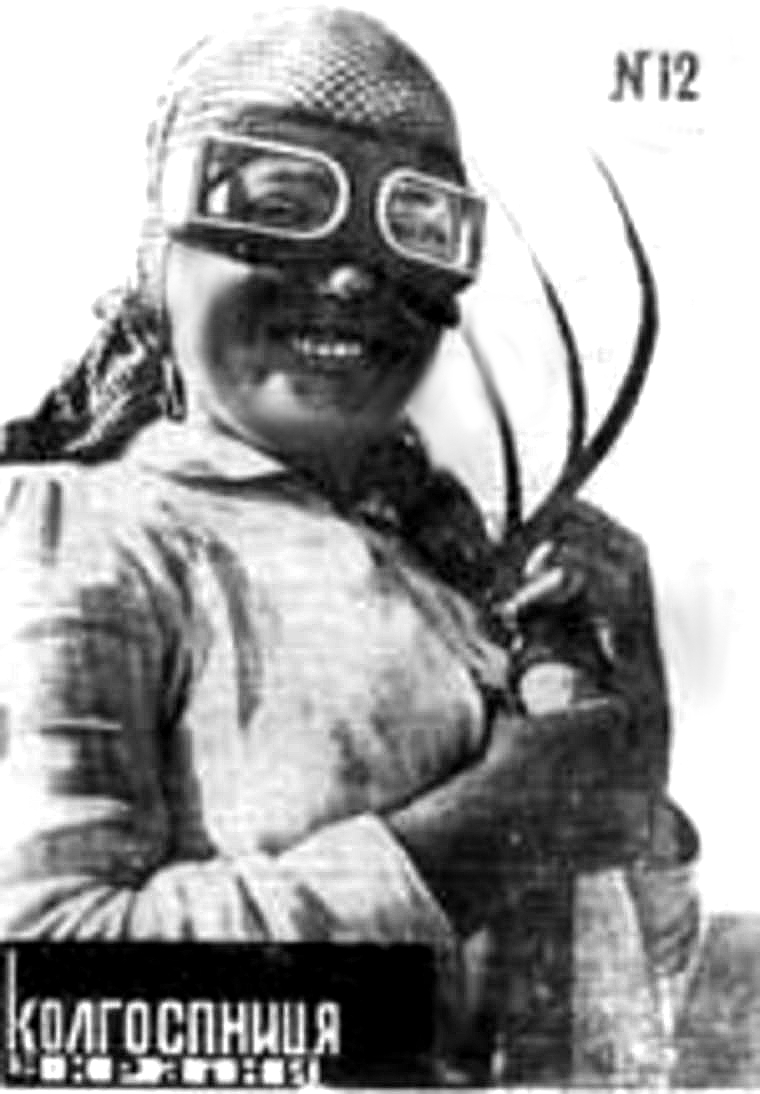
Cover of the Soviet magazine Kolhospnytsia Ukrayiny ("Collective Farm Woman of Ukraine"), December 1932

Approaches to changing from individual farming to a collective type of agricultural production had existed since 1917, but for various reasons (lack of agricultural equipment, agronomy resources, etc.) were not implemented widely until 1925, when there was a more intensive effort by the agricultural sector to increase the number of agricultural cooperatives and bolster the effectiveness of already existing sovkhozes. In late 1927, after the XV Congress of the Communist Party of the Soviet Union, then known as the All-Union Communist party (Bolsheviks) or VKP(b), a significant impetus was given to the collectivization effort.

In 1927, a drought shortened the harvest in southern areas of Ukraine and North Caucasus. In 1927 and 1928 the winter tillage area was badly affected due to low snow levels. Despite seed aid from the state, many affected areas were not re-sown. The 1928 harvest was affected by drought in most of the grain producing areas of Ukraine. Shortages in the harvest and difficulties with the supply system invoked difficulties with the food supply in urban areas and destabilized the food supply situation in the USSR in general. In order to alleviate the situation, a system of food rationing was implemented in the second quarter of 1928 initially in Odessa, and later spread to Mariupol, Kherson, Kyiv, Dniprelstan (Dnipropetrovsk), and Kharkiv. At the beginning of 1929 a similar system was implemented throughout the USSR. Despite the aid from the Soviet Ukrainian and the Central governments, many southern rural areas registered occurrences of malnutrition and in some cases hunger and starvation (the affected areas and thus the amount of required food aid was under-accounted by authorities). Due to the shortage of forage livestock, its numbers were also affected (see table below). Most of kolkhozes and recently refurnished sovkhozes went through these years with few losses, and some were even able to provide assistance to peasants in the more affected areas (seed and grain for food).

=== Early stages ===
Despite an intense state campaign, collectivization, which was initially voluntary, was not popular amongst peasants: as of early 1929, only 5.6% of Ukrainian peasant households and 3.8% of arable land was "collectivized". In early 1929, the methods employed by the specially empowered authority "UkrKolhozcenter" changed from a voluntary enrolment to an administrative one. By October 1, 1929, a plan for the creation of kolkhozes was "outperformed" by 239%. As a result, 8.8% of arable land was "collectivized".

=== "Fast track collectivization" ===
The next major step toward "all-over collectivization" took place after an article was published by Joseph Stalin in Pravda, in early November 1929.

While "summoned" by the November 10–17, 1929 meeting of VKP(b) Central Committee, the "Twenty-Five Thousanders" only trained at special short courses, the main driving force of collectivization and dekulakization in Ukraine became a "poor peasants committee" ("komnezamy") and local village councils (silrady) where komnezams members had a voting majority.

The USSR Kolhozcenter issued the December 10, 1929, decree on collectivisation of livestock within a 3-month period (draft animals 100%, cattle 100%, pigs 80%, sheep and goats 60%). This drove many peasants to slaughter their livestock. By January 1, 1930, the percentage of collectivized households almost doubled, to 16.4% of the total number of households.

Ukraine livestock (thousand head)
Year	Total horses	Working horses	Total cattle	Oxen	Bulls	Cows	Pigs	Sheep and goats
1927	5056.5	3900.1	8374.5	805.5	...	3852.1	4412.4	7956.3
1928	5486.9	4090.5	8604.8	895.3	32.8	3987.0	6962.9	8112.2
1929	5607.5	4198.8	7611.0	593.7	26.9	3873.0	4161.2	7030.8
1930	5308.2	3721.6	6274.1	254.8	49.6	3471.6	3171.8	4533.4
1931	4781.3	3593.7	6189.5	113.8	40.0	3377.0	3373.3	3364.8
1932	3658.9	...	5006.7	105.2	...	2739.5	2623.7	2109.5
1933	2604.8	...	4446.3	116.9	...	2407.2	2089.2	2004.7
1934	2546.9	2197.3	5277.5	156.5	46.7	2518.0	4236.7	2197.1

Despite the infamous January 5, 1930, decree, in which the deadline for the complete collectivization of Ukraine was set for the period from the end of 1931 to the spring of 1932, Ukraine authorities decided to accelerate the completion of the campaign by autumn of 1930. The high expectations of the plan were outperformed by local authorities even without the assistance of the 7500 "Twenty-Five Thousanders who had reached some areas only by mid-February – by March 70.9% of arable land and 62.8% of peasant households were suddenly collectivized. The dekulakization plan was also "over-performed". Almost 200,000 households (3.8% of total peasant households) were affected by the requisition of property, land, and houses. Some of the peasants were arrested and deported "to the north". Many arrested kulaks and "well-to-do" farmers resettled their families to the Urals and Central Asia, where they were often exploited in others sectors of the economy, such as timber cutting. The term kulak was ultimately applied to anybody resisting collectivization as many of the so-called kulaks were no more well-off than other peasants.

=== "Dizzy with success" ===
The fast-track to collectivization incited numerous peasant revolts in Ukraine and in other parts of the USSR. In response to the situation, the Soviet regime stepped back: the March 2, 1930, issue of Pravda published the Stalin's article "Dizzy with success". Soon, numerous orders and decrees were issued banning the use of force and administrative methods. Some of "mistakenly dekulakized" received their property back, and even some mistakenly deported returned home but in insignificant numbers—most remained where they had been deported. The collectivization process was rolled back: by 1 May 1933 38.2% of Ukrainian peasant households and 41.1% of arable land had been collectivized. By the end of August, these numbers declined to 29.2% and 35.6% respectively.

=== Second "voluntary" collectivization ===
A second forced "voluntary" collectivization campaign was initiated in the winter–summer of 1931 with significant assistance of the so-called "tug-brigades" composed from kolkhoz udarniks. Many kulaks along with families were deported from Ukraine.

According to declassified data, around 300,000 peasants in Ukraine out of a population of about 30 million were subject to these policies in 1930–31. Ukrainians composed 15% of the total 1.8 million kulaks relocated Soviet-wide. On July 20, 1931 – as a response to the numerous regional requests for additional numbers of kulak deportations Politburo of VKP(b) concluded that the "strategic task of the Party was almost accomplished. All further deportations were recommended to be administered only to individuals."

This second forced "voluntary" collectivization campaign also invoked a delay in sowing. As a result, cereal crops were heavily affected by the 1931 drought. During winter and spring of 1930–31, the Ukrainian agricultural authority "Narkomzem" Ukrainian SSR issued several reports about the significant decline of livestock and especially draft-animal power caused by poor treatment, absence of forage, stables/farms and due to the "kulaks sabotage".

According to the first five-year plan, Ukrainian agriculture was to switch from an exclusive orientation of grain to a more diverse output. This included not only a rise in sugar beet crops, but also other types of agricultural production were expected to be utilised by industry (with even cotton plants being established in 1931). This plan anticipated a decrease in the area of grain cultivated, in contrast to an increase of yield and area for other crops. By July 1, 1931, 65.7% of Ukrainian peasant households and 67.2% of arable land were reported as "collectivized". The main grain and sugar beet production areas, however, were collectivized to a greater extent — 80-90%.

=== Clarified "All-over collectivization" ===
The decree of Central Committee of VKP(b) from August 2, 1931, clarified the "all-over collectivization" term - in order to be considered complete the "all-over collectivization" does not have to reach 100%, but not less than 68–70% of peasants households and not less than 75-80% of arable lands. According to the same decree "all-over collectivization" accomplished at Northern Caucasus (Kuban) - 88% of households and 92% of arable lands "collectivized", Ukraine (South) – 85 and 94 percents respectively, Ukraine (Right Bank) – 69 and 80 percents respectively, and Moldavian ASSR (part of Ukrainian SSR) – 68 and 75 percent.

As of the beginning of October 1931, the collectivization of 68.0% of peasant households, and 72.0% of arable land was complete.

=== 1931 plan ===
The plan for the state grain collection in Ukraine adopted for 1931 was over-optimistic — 510 million poods (8.4 Tg). Drought, administrative distribution of the plan for kolkhozes, together with the lack of relevant management generally destabilized the situation. Significant amounts of grain remained unharvested. A significant percentage was lost during processing and transportation, or spoiled at elevators (wet grain). The total Winter sowing area shrunk by approximately 2 million hectares. Livestock in kolkhozes remained without forage, which was collected under grain procurement. A similar occurrence happened with respect to seeds and wages awarded in kind for kolhoz members. Nevertheless, grain collection continued till May 1932 but reached only 90% of expected plan figures. By the end of December 1931, the collection plan was accomplished by 79%. Many kolkhozes from December 1931 onwards suffered from lack of food, resulting in an increased number of deaths caused by malnutrition registered by OGPU in some areas (Moldavia as a whole and several central rayons of Vinnytsia, Kyiv and North-East rayons of Odessa oblasts) in winter-spring and the early summer months of 1932. By 1932 the sowing campaign of Ukraine was obtained with minimal power as most of the remaining horses were incapable of working, while the number of available agricultural tractors was too small to fill the gap.

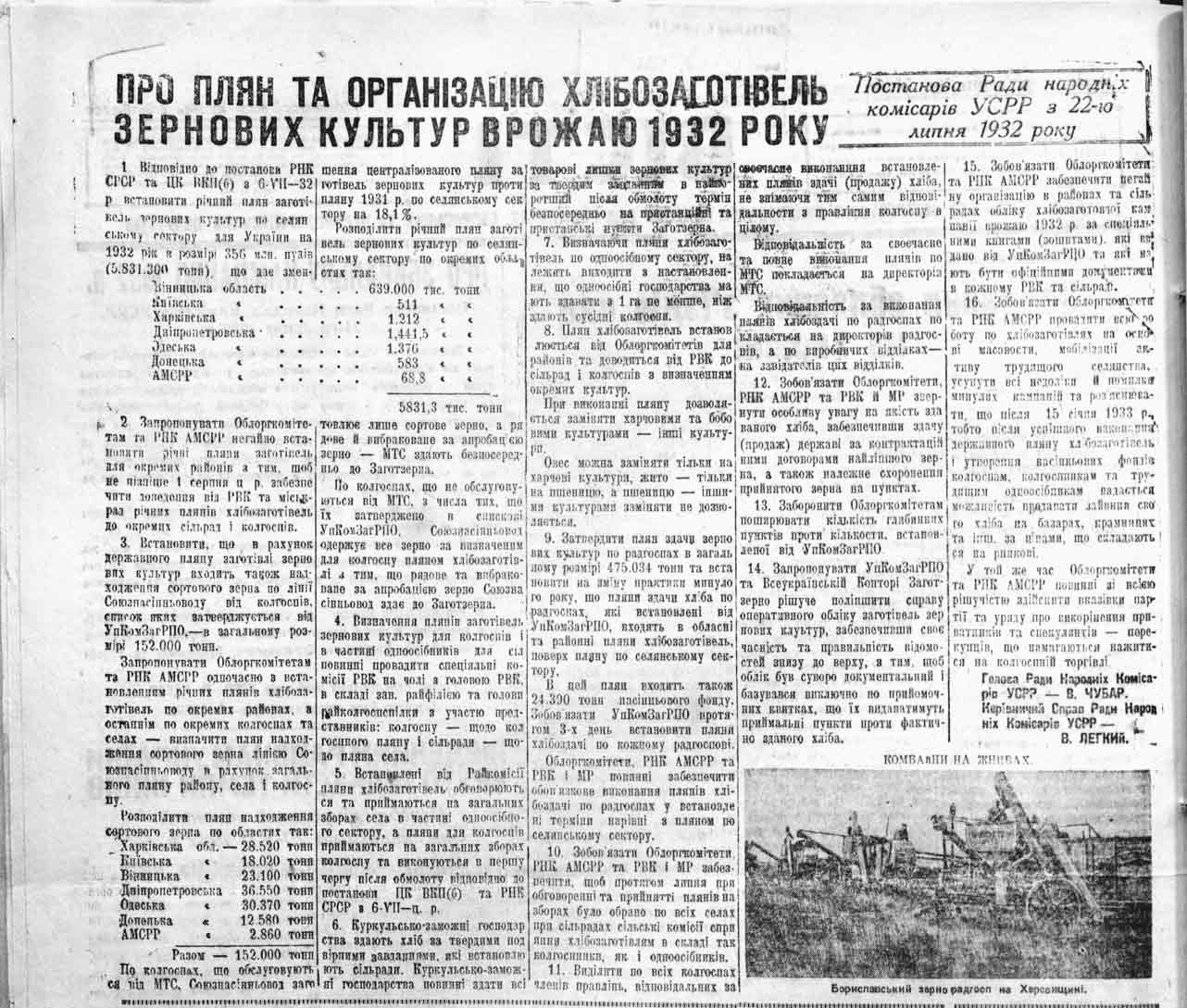
Article from a Soviet newspaper with the first version of a plan for grain collections in 1932 for kolkhozes and peasants - 5,831.3 thousand tons + sovkhozes 475,034 tons

Speculative prices on food in the cooperative network (5–10 times more as compared with neighbouring Soviet republics) invoked a significant movement of peasants in search for bread. Attempts were made to manage the problem with bread speculation by imposing a quota on all carried foods met with very limited success. On the request of Kosior such provisions were lifted by Stalin at the end of May 1932. The July GPU reports for the first half of 1932, mentioned the "difficulties with food" in 127 rayons (out of 484), acknowledged the fact that they did not have information for all regions. The Decree of Sovnarkom on "Kolkhoz Trade" issued in May, fostered rumors amongst peasants that collectivization was once again rolled-back as it had been in the spring 1930. As a result, the number of peasants who abandoned the kolkhozes significantly increased.

=== 1932 situation ===
The Government of the Ukrainian SSR tried to remedy the situation from March with recourse to internal resources, but had little success - withdrawal of food from other Ukrainian regions depleted their own limited supplies. Starting in February 1932, administrative and territorial reform (oblast creation) also added mismanagement cast, - even Moscow had more details about the seed situation than the Ukrainian authorities. In May, in a desperate effort to change the situation, the central Soviet Government provided 7.1 million poods of grain for food for Ukraine and reverted no less than 700 agricultural tractors intended for other regions of USSR. By July, the total amount of aid provided from Central Soviet Authorities for food, sowing and forage for "agricultural sector" was numbered more than 17 million poods.

Taking into account the situation in Ukraine, the central grain collection plan was lowered by 18.1%, in comparison to the 1931 plan. Kolkhozes were expected to harvest 4,751.2 thousand tons, with the peasants responsible for 1,080.1 thousand tons. Sovkhozes were to submit 475,034 tons. In addition Ukrainian kolkhozes and sovkhozes were to return 132,750 tons of grain which had been provided in spring 1932 as aid. The grain collection plan for July 1932 was adopted to collect 19.5 million poods.

The actual state of collection was disastrous however, and by 31 July only 3 million poods (compared to 21 million in 1931) were collected. As of July 20 the harvested area was half of that in 1931. The sovkhozes had only sowed 16% of the defined area.

Collectivization in Ukraine as of October 1, 1932
Oblast (in late 1932 administrative borders)	Number of kolhozes	% of peasantry households collectivization
Kyiv Oblast	4,053	67.3
Chernihiv Oblast	2,332	47.3
Vinnytsia Oblast	3,347	58.9
Kharkiv Oblast	4,347	72.0
Dnipropetrovsk Oblast	3,399	85.1
Odessa Oblast	3,594	84.4
Donetsk Oblast	1,578	84.4
Moldavian ASSR	620	68.3
Ukraine	23,270	69.0 (77.1% of arable land)

This disparity between agricultural goals, and actual production grew later in the year. An expected 190 thousand tons of grain were to be exported, but by August 27, 1932, only 20 thousand tons were ready. Ukraine met with difficulty in supplying the planned amount of food and as a result a rationing system was implemented to supply urban areas with food. This system became the major source of food delivery to cities while the alternatives, cooperative trade and black market trading, became too expensive, and under-supplied, to provide long-range assistance. By October 25, the plan for grain collection was lowered once again, from the quantity called for in the plan of August 22, 1932. Nevertheless, collection reached only 39% of the annually planned total. A second lowering of goals deducted 70 million poods but still demanded plan completion, and 100% efficiency. Attempts to reach the new goals of production proved futile in late 1932. On November 29, in order to complete the plan, Ukraine was to collect 94 million poods, 4.8 of them from sovkhozes. As of January 2, targets were again lowered, to 62.5 million poods. Later that month, on January 14, the targets were lowered even further– by 29.4 million poods, to 33.1 million. Vinnytsia, Kyiv oblasts and Moldavian ASSR had accomplished the lowered 1932 plan for grain procurement, but not for sowing reserves. The total remains for Ukraine was 22.1 million poods. At the same time, GPU of Ukraine reported hunger and starvation in the Kyiv and Vinnytsia oblasts, and began implementing measures to remedy the situation. By January 29 Kharkiv Oblast had also fulfilled the grain collection plan, and reached its production target. Despite these apparent successes in production, the total amount of grain collected by February 5 was only 255 million poods (compared to 440 million poods in 1931) while the numbers of "hunger and malnutrition cases" as registered by the GPU of Ukraine, increased every day, particularly in rural areas and small towns.

By early 1932, 69% of households were collectivized. Even though several other regions in the USSR were collectivized to a greater extent, the effect of the collectivization on the Ukrainian agriculture was very substantial.

USSR Grain production and collections, 1930–33 (million tons)
Year	Production	Collections	Remainder	Collections as % of production
1930	73-77	22.1	51-55	30.2-28.7
1931	57-65	22.8	34-43	40–35.1
1932	55-60	18.5	36.5-41.5	33.6-30.8
1933	70-77	22.7	47.3-54.3	32.4-29.5

Whilst the long-lasting effect of overall collectivization had an adverse effect on agricultural output everywhere, Ukraine had long been the most agriculturally productive area, providing over 50% of exported grain and 25% of total production of grain in the Russian Empire in 1913. Over 228,936 square kilometres (56.571 million acres), 207,203 km^{2} (51.201 million acres) were used for grain production, or 90.5% of total arable land. This degree of dependency on agriculture meant that the effects of a bad harvest could be almost unlimited. This had been long recognised, and while projections for agricultural production were adjusted, the shock of limited production could not be easily managed. While collections by the state were in turn, limited, there were already clear stresses. The 1932 total Soviet harvest, was to be 29.5 million tons in state collections of grain out of 90.7 million tons in production. But the actual result was a disastrous 55-60 million tons in production. The state ended up collecting only 18.5 million tons in grain. The total Soviet collections by the state were virtually the same in 1930 and 1931 at about 22.8 million tons. For 1932, they had significantly been reduced to 18.5 million tons; with even lower figure in Ukraine. These were the total estimated outcomes of the grain harvests:

== Other related events ==
=== Procurement practice ===
In 1928, a "by contract" policy of procurement (contracts for the delivery of agricultural products) was implemented for kolkhozes and ordinary peasants alike ("kulaks" had a "firm" plan for procurement) . Accordingly, from 1928 through January 1933, "grain production areas" were required to submit 1/3–1/4 of their estimated yield, while areas designated as "grain" were required to submit no more than 1/8 of their estimated yield. However, between the Autumn of 1930 and the Spring of 1932, local authorities tended to collect products from kolkhozes in amounts greater than the minimum required in order to exceed the contracted target (in some cases by more than 200%). Especially harmful methods utilized in the "by contract" policy were "counterplan" actions, which were additional collection plans implemented in already fulfilled contracts. Such "counterplan" measures were strictly forbidden after the Spring of 1933 as "extremely harmful for kolkhoz development."

In 1932 a "1/4 of yield" procurement quota for "grain production areas" of Ukraine were planned for implementation. On September 23, 1932, a telegram signed by Molotov and Stalin noted that the harvest of 1932 was "satisfactory", according to estimates provided by the agricultural planning authorities, and therefore requests for seed for winter crops were refused while total winter-tillage area demands were increased. Later, Stalin blamed the statistical and planning authorities for inaccurately estimating potential yields and thus a "Commissions for yield estimation" was created on December 17, 1932, by his order. Some modern historians also agree that the 1932 harvest figures provided at the time were largely overestimated and the actual difference between estimated and actual harvest was significant. Such unrealistic figures resulted in demand that was impossibly to fulfill and resulted in lesser reduction of grain procurement plan and greater grain procurement than were possible in late 1932 through the February 5, 1933

Ukraine Grain production and collections, 1927–33 (million tons)
Year	Production	Collections
1927	18.67	0.83 centralized collection only
1928	13.88	1.44
1929	18.7	4.56
1930	22.72	6.92
1931	18.34	7.39
1932	14.65	4.28
1933	22.29 (including sorgo)	5.98

=== Legislation provisions ===
On August 7, 1932, the Soviet government passed a law "on the safekeeping of Socialist property" that imposed from a ten-year prison sentence to the death penalty for any theft of socialist property. Stalin personally appended the stipulation: "People who encroach on socialist property should be considered enemies of the people." Within five months after passage of the law, 54,645 individuals were sentenced under its provisions, of which, 2,110 were sentenced to death. The initial wording of the Decree "On fought with speculation" adopted August 22, 1932 lead to common situations where acts by minor such as bartering tobacco for bread were documented as punished by 5 years imprisonment. After 1934, by NKVD demand, the penalty for minor offences was limited to a fine of 500 rubles or 3 months of correctional labor.

The existed practice of administrative punishment known as "black board" (black list) by the November, 18 Decree of Central Committee of the Communist Party (Bolshevik) of Ukraine was applied to a greater extent and with more harsh methods to selected villages and kolkhozes that were considered to be "underperforming" in the grain collection procurement: "Immediate cessation of delivery of goods, complete suspension of cooperative and state trade in the villages, and removal of all available goods from cooperative and state stores". Full prohibition of collective farm trade for both collective farms and collective farmers, and for private farmers. Cessation of any sort of credit and demand for early repayment of credit and other financial obligations." Initially such sanctions were applied to only six villages, but later they were applied to numerous rural settlements and districts. For peasants, who were not kolkhoz members and who were "underperforming" in the grain collection procurement, special "measures" were adopted. To "reach the grain procurement quota" amongst peasants 1,100 brigades were organized which consisted of activists (often from neighbouring villages) which had accomplished their grain procurement quota or were close to accomplishing it. Since most of goods supplied to the rural areas was commercial (fabrics, matches, fuels) and was sometimes obtained by villagers from neighbouring cities or railway stations, sanctioned villages remained for a long period – as an example mentioned in the December 6 Decree the village of Kamyani Potoky was removed from blacklist only October 17, 1933 when they completed their plan for grain collection early. Since January 1933 the black list regime was "softened" when 100% of plan execution was no longer demanded, mentioned in the December 6 Decree villages Liutenky and Havrylivka were removed from the black list after 88 and 70% of plan completion respectively.

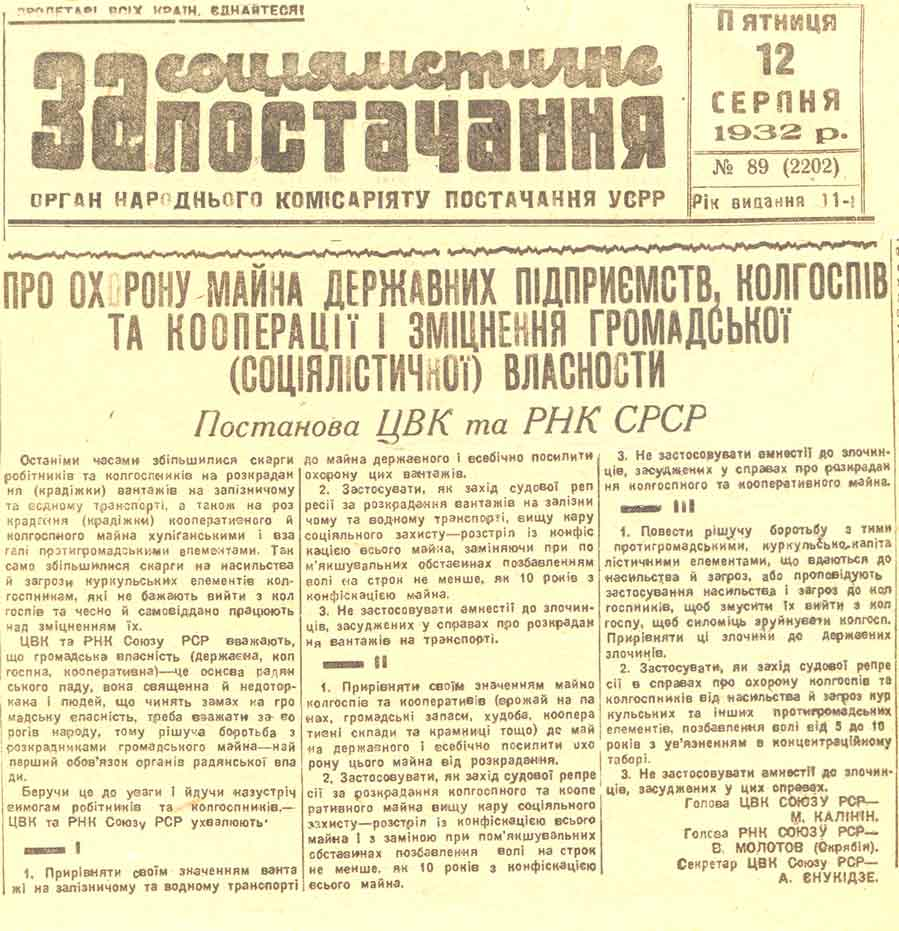
Law "On the safekeeping of Socialist property" text 12 of August 1932

Measures were undertaken to persecute those withholding or bargaining grain. This was done frequently by requisition detachments, which raided farms to collect grain, and was done regardless of whether the peasants retained enough grain to feed themselves, or whether they had enough seed left to plant the next harvest.

=== Restrictions on freedom of movement ===
Special barricades were set up by GPU units throughout the USSR to prevent an exodus of peasants from the hunger-stricken regions. During a single month in 1933, 219,460 people were intercepted and escorted back or arrested and sentenced. In Ukraine, these measures had the following results, according to the declassified documents during the 11 days (23 January–2 February) after the January 22, 1933 Decree 3861 people were intercepted of which 340 were arrested "for further recognition". During the same period, in trains and at railway stations on the whole Ukrainian territory, there were 16,773 people intercepted (907 of those not living in Ukraine); out of those, 1,610 people were arrested. Such figures also included criminals. In the same document, the OGPU informed about the number of peasants which already had left the Ukrainian territory (94,433 persons) during the period from December 15, 1932, to January 2, 1933 (data for 215 districts out of 484, and Moldavian ASSR).

The government introduced new identity papers and obligatory registration for citizens in December 1932. Initially, the area of new identity papers and obligatory registration implementation were limited to Moscow and Leningrad (encircling 100 km ) and Kharkiv (encircling 50 km) and the new measures were planned for implementation by June 1933. Travel from Ukraine and the Northern Caucasus (Kuban) kray (region) was specifically forbidden by directives of January 22, 1933 (signed by Molotov and Stalin) and of January 23, 1933 (joint directive VKP(b) Central Committee and Sovnarkom). The directives stated that the travels "for bread" from these areas were organized by enemies of the Soviet power with the purpose of agitation in northern areas of the USSR against kolkhozes, same as it happened last year (1932) from Ukraine, but were not prevented. Therefore, railway tickets were to be sold only by ispolkom permits, and those who already reached the north should be arrested.

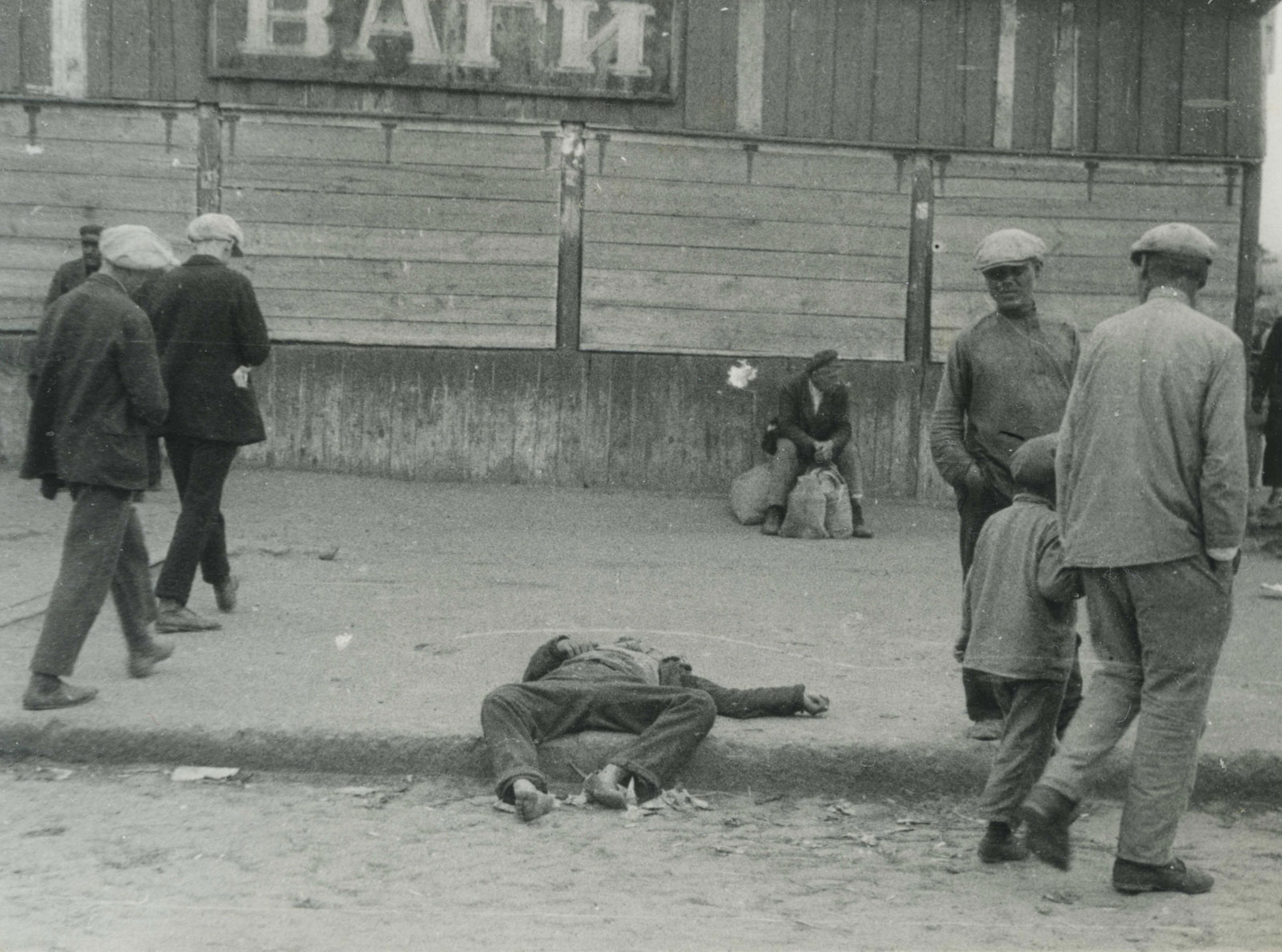
Street in Kharkiv, 1932

=== Information blockade ===
On February 23, 1933, Politburo of VKP(b) Central Committee adopted a decree "About foreign journalists travel through USSR" which expected what they can be travel and reside in mentioned areas only after approval and obtained a permit from General Directorate of Militia". The Soviet government denied initial reports of the famine (but agreed with information about malnutrition), and prevented foreign journalists from travelling in the region. At the same time there was no credible evidence of information blockade arrangements on a considerable number of foreign specialists (engineers, workers, etc.) which engaged at many construction site at Ukrainian territory.

For example, Gareth Jones, one of Lloyd George's private secretaries spent several days in mid-March in travel "all twenty villages, not only in the Ukraine, but also in the black earth district, and in the Moscow region, and that I slept in peasants' cottages, and did not immediately leave for the next village". He easily reached neighbouring rural areas of capital of Soviet Ukraine – Kharkov, spent some days there and despite what he has not "saw in the villages no dead human beings nor animals" this journalist who never before saw a famine evidence, reported "that there was famine in the Soviet Union" (actually increasing of death rate from starvation wider affected Kharkov Oblasts in mid April-begin of June 1933).

On August 23, 1933, foreign correspondents were warned individually by the press section of the Foreign Office of USSR not to attempt to travel to the provinces or elsewhere in the Soviet Union without first obtaining formal permission. Foreign Office of USSR without explanation refused permission to William H. Chamberlain, Christian Science Monitor correspondent, to visit and observe the harvest in the principal agricultural regions of the North Caucasus and Ukraine. Several months (May–July 1933) ago two other American correspondents were forbidden to make a trip to Ukraine. Such restriction was softened since September 1933.

Scholars who have conducted research in declassified archives have reported "the Politburo and regional Party committees insisted that immediate and decisive action be taken in response to the famine such that 'conscientious farmers' not suffer, while district Party committees were instructed to supply every child with milk and decreed that those who failed to mobilize resources to feed the hungry or denied hospitalization to famine victims be prosecuted."

Based on data collected by undercover investigation and photos, the Bohemian-Austrian Catholic Theodor Cardinal Innitzer by the end of 1933 made campaigns of awareness in the West about the massive deaths by hunger and even cases of cannibalism that were occurring in Ukraine and the North Caucasus at that time.

=== Insufficient assistance ===
Starved peasants on a street in Kharkiv, 1933

First reports about difficulties with food (malnutrition, hunger) in rural areas and same situation in towns (which undersupplied through rationing system) from Ukrainian GPU and Oblasts Authorities referred to beginning, mid-January 1933. "Measures to localize the cases" predominantly based on locally available resources. While the numbers of such reports and areas mentioned in them increased (as also a quantity of food requested ) Central Committee of the Communist Party (Bolshevik) of Ukraine issued a February 8, 1933 Decree which urged what every "hunger case" should be treated without delay and with maximum mobilization of own resources of kolkhozes, rayons, towns, and oblasts". Also that decree demanded "within 7 days term" an information about food aid which should be provided from "central sources". As of February 20, 1933 Dnipropetrovska oblast - reported as most affected – received 1.2 million of poods of food aid, Odeska – 0.8 million, Kharkovska – 0.3 million accordingly to the Order of Central Committee of VKP(b). For Kyiv oblast by March, 18, decree of VKP(b) was allocated 6 million of poods. Ukrainian Authorities also provide the aid but it was limited to resources available. In order to preserve orphaned and affected by hunger children Ukrainian GPU and Peoples Commissariat of Heals created special commission; was established a kindergartens network were children should get an additional food (sugar, oils, products from grain), specially directed for him from Central Ukrainian and Soviet authorities. Urban areas also significantly affected by shortage food supplied predominantly through of rationing system. March 20, 1933 Stalin sign a decree which lowered the monthly milling levy for Ukraine by 14 thousand tons, which amount should be redistributed as additional bread supply "for students, small towns and small enterprises in big cities and specially in Kyiv".

However food aid distribution was not relevantly managed and redistributed by regional and local authorities, even not spoken about differences in amount required and amount provided.

Overturning the first wave of hunger in February – March Ukrainian authorities met with second even worst wave of hunger in starvation in April- May – especially in Kyiv and Kharkiv oblasts (delayed winter also add additional casts to that regions situation).

Between February and June 1933, at least thirty-five Politburo decisions and Sovnarkom decrees selectively authorized issue of a total of 35.19 million poods (576,400 tonnes) or more than half of total aid to whole Soviet agriculture - 1.1 million ton provided by Central soviet Authorities in winter-spring 1933 - of grain for food, seeds and forage for Ukrainian peasants, kolhozes and sovhozes. Such figures do not include grain and flour aid provided for urban population, children and aid from local sources. Stalin personally authorized distribution of aid in the case of a request by Michail Aleksandrovich Sholokhov, whose own district was stricken. However, Stalin also reprimanded Sholokhov for failing to recognize "sabotage" within his district. This was the only instance that a specific amount of aid was given a specific district. Other appeals were not as successful and many desperate pleas were cut back or rejected.

Documents from the Soviet archives indicate that the aid distribution was made selectively to the most affected areas and from the spring months such assistance has the goal of the relief effort at sowing time was targeted to recovering patients. A special resolution of the Central Committee of the Communist Party (Bolshevik) of Ukraine for the Kyiv Oblast, from March 31, 1933, ordered dividing peasants hospitalized into ailing and recovering patients. The resolution ordered improving the nutrition of the latter within the limits of available resources so that they could be sent out into the fields to sow the new crop as soon as possible. The food was dispensed according to special resolutions from the government bodies, and additional food was given in the field where the labourers worked.

=== Export of grain ===
After recognition of the famine situation in Ukraine during the drought and poor harvests, the Soviet government in Moscow continued to export grain rather than retain its crop to feed the people, even though on a significantly lower level than in previous years. In 1930–31 there had been 5,832,000 tons of grains exported In 1931–32, grain exports declined to 4,786,000 tons. In 1932–33, grain exports were just 1,607,000 tons and in 1933–34, this further declined to 1,441,000 tons. Officially published data slightly differ

Cereals : 1930 - 4,846,024;
1931 - 5,182,835; 1932 - 1,819,114 (first half of 1932 - approx 750 000, from late April grain also imported - approx. 157,000 tonnes ); 1933 - 1,771,364 tonnes (first half of 1933 - 220 000, late March grain also imported).

From that wheat: 1930 - 2,530,953; 1931 - 2,498,958; 1932 - 550,917; 1933 - 748,248 tons. Via Ukrainian commercial ports in 1932 were exported (thousand tons): 988.3 -grains, 16,5 other types of cereals; in 1933 - 809.6,-grains 2.6 -cereals; 3.5 meat, 0.4- butter, 2.5 - fish.

Via Ukrainian commercial ports in 1932 were imported (thousand tons): 1932 - no more than 67.2 of grains and cereals 1933 - 8.6 of grains.

Received from other Soviet ports - 1932 (thousand tons): 164 - grains, 7.3 - other types of cereals, fish -31.5 and no more than 177 thousand tons of meat and butter 1933- 230 - grains, 15.3 other types of cereals 0.1 - meat, 0.9- butter, fish - 34.3.

=== Sovkhozes and general problems of 1932 ===
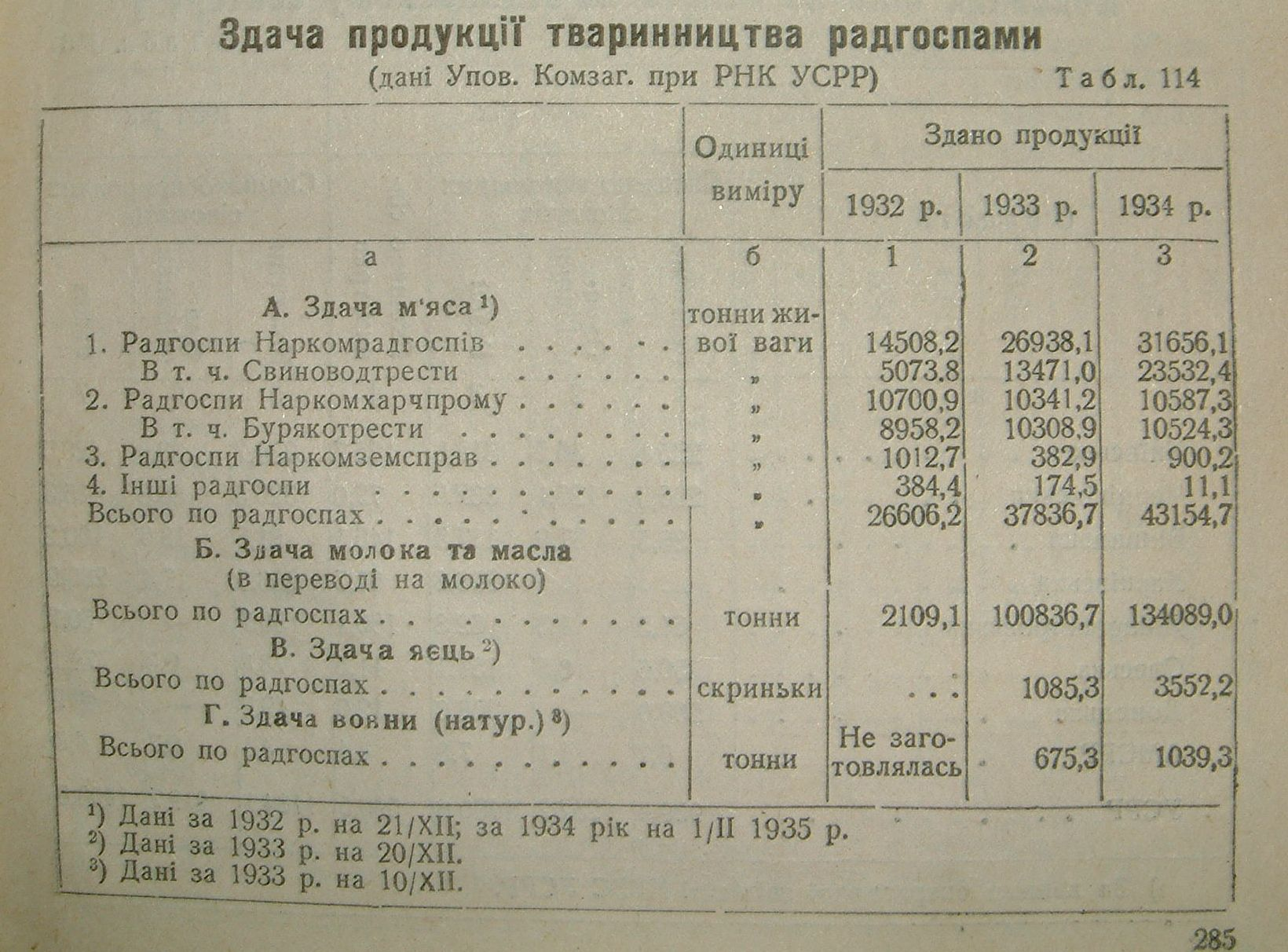
Ukraine Sovkhozes delivery of meat, milk and eggs in 1932-34

After grain collection difficulties in 1927 and 1928, Stalin ordered the creation of state grain and meat enterprises – sovkhozes - which, accordingly to his initial vision, should deliver more than 100 million of poods of grain in 1932. However, in 1932 their production results were disastrous because of poor general and agricultural management and planning, despite the significant (as compared to kolkhozes) amount of modern agricultural mechanisms (agricultural tractors, harvesters, etc.) employed. But the biggest reason was that they continually seed wheat from 1929 on the same areas and even without fertilizers. Sovkhozes also suffered from a lack of manpower and infrastructure (roads, elevators etc.). Losses during harvesting were extremely high. Thus despite an expected 290 million poods (more than 5 million tons) in 1932, sovkhozes produced 5 time less, while the situation with livestock was even worse. As of July 20, 1932 sovhozes of the Ukrainian SSR had only logged a mere 16% of the defined sawing area.

=== Primitive agriculture ===
Another factor in the decline of the harvests were the shortage of drought power for ploughing and reaping was even more acute in 1932 than in the previous year. The number of working horses declined from 19.5 million on July 1, 1931, to 16.2 million on July 1, 1932. The desperate efforts to replace horses by tractors failed to compensate for this loss. In 1931, the total supply of tractors to agriculture amounted to 964,000 hp (719,000 kW), 393,000 produced at home and 578,000 imported. But in 1932, because of the foreign trade crisis and home producing establishing, no tractors at all were imported.

Number of tractors in Ukraine (pcs by end of the year)
Year	Tractors	H.P.
1929–30	15,112	160,500
1931	26,051	321,097
1932	39,089	514,259
1933	51,320	720,094
1934	64,516	933,300

In the whole of 1932, only 679,000 tractor horsepower was supplied to agriculture, considerably less than in 1931. Only about half became available in time for the harvest, and even less in time for the spring sowing. Animal drought power deteriorated in quality. Horses were fed and maintained even more inadequately than in the previous year. The acute shortage of horses led to the notorious decision to employ cows as working animals. According to the speech of one Soviet official at one of the most affected by famine region, the Dnipropetrovsk Oblast "in 1932 we employ only 9000 cows, but in 1933 we involve at least 3/4 of their total number; 57,000 employed at sowing." February 23, the Lower Volga party bureau decided to use 200,000 cows for special field work.

=== Books and articles ===
- Yar Slavutyth, survivor - actual accounts- Alberta Report feature
- Marco Carynnyk, Lubomyr Luciuk and Bohdan S Kordan, eds, The Foreign Office and the Famine: British Documents on Ukraine and the Great Famine of 1932–1933, foreword by Michael Marrus (Kingston: Limestone Press, 1988)
- Robert Conquest
- Robert W. Davies; Wheatcroft, Stephen G., The Years of Hunger. Soviet Agriculture 1931–1933, Houndmills 2004 ISBN 3-412-10105-2, also ISBN 0-333-31107-8
- Robert W. Davies; Wheatcroft, Stephen G., Stalin and the Soviet Famine of 1932-33 - A Reply to Ellman, in: Europe-Asia Studies Vol. 58 (2006), 4, pp. 625–633.
- Miron Dolot, EXECUTION BY HUNGER: THE HIDDEN HOLOCAUST, New York: W.W Norton & Company, 1985, xvi + 231 pp. ISBN 0-393-01886-5.
- Barbara Falk, Sowjetische Städte in der Hungersnot 1932/33. Staatliche Ernährungspolitik und städtisches Alltagsleben (= Beiträge zur Geschichte Osteuropas 38), Köln: Böhlau Verlag 2005 ISBN 3-412-10105-2
- Wasyl Hryshko, The Ukrainian Holocaust of 1933, (Toronto: 1983, Bahriany Foundation)
- Stanislav Kulchytsky, Hennadiy Yefimenko. Демографічні наслідки голодомору 1933 р. в Україні. Всесоюзний перепис 1937 р. в Україні: документи та матеріали (Demographic consequence of Holodomor of 1933 in Ukraine. The all-Union census of 1937 in Ukraine), Kyiv, Institute of History, 2003.
- R. Kusnierz, Ukraina w latach kolektywizacji i Wielkiego Glodu (1929-1933), Torun, 2005
- Leonard Leshuk, ed, Days of Famine, Nights of Terror: Firsthand Accounts of Soviet Collectivization, 1928-1934 (Kingston: Kashtan Press, 1995)
- Lubomyr Luciuk, ed, Not Worthy: Walter Duranty's Pulitzer Prize and The New York Times (Kingston: Kashtan Press, 2004)
- Rajca, Czesław (2005). Głód na Ukrainie. Lublin/Toronto: Werset. ISBN 978-83-60133-04-0.
- Stephen G. Wheatcroft: Towards Explaining the Soviet Famine of 1931-1933: Political and Natural Factors in Perspective, in: Food and Foodways Vol. 12 (2004), No. 2-3, pp. 104–136.

== See also ==
- Outline of the Holodomor
- Bibliography of the Holodomor
