= Buryat revolt =

Buryat anti-Soviet revolt

- Part of Collectivization in the Soviet Union
Date	1929
Location	Buryat Autonomous Soviet Socialist Republic
Result	Soviet victory: Buddhist monasteries closed; Lamas exiled; Anti-Buryat purges in Mongolia; Mongolian alphabet replaced with Romanized characters in 1931; 10,000 killed in 1937–1938 purges

Belligerents
Soviet Union	Buryats

Commanders and leaders
Joseph Stalin; Yakov Epstein	Unknown

Units involved
Red Army	Buryat rebels and farmers

Casualties and losses
Unknown	35,000 Buryats killed

The Buryat revolt was a poorly organized uprising within the Soviet Union, triggered by oppressive policies and discrimination against the Buryats, a Mongolic ethnic group primarily adhering to Buddhism.

The revolt was initiated in response to Joseph Stalin's forced collectivization strategy, which sought to amalgamate individual landholdings into collective farms. However, the Soviet regime quickly quashed the revolt, killing approximately 35,000 people with another 10,000 later killed in political purges. Some Buryats escaped southward to Mongolia.

The failed uprising highlights the profound ethnic tensions and resistance to Soviet collectivization, leaving a lasting impact on the Buryat community and Soviet ethnic policies.

== History ==
In 1928, the Soviet Union under the leadership of Joseph Stalin implemented a forced policy of collectivization across the Soviet Union. The policy aimed to integrate individual landholdings and labor into collectively-controlled and state-controlled farms. Collectivization angered the largely agricultural Buryats.

Prior to the implementation of the collectivization policies, the Buryats, a Mongolic ethnic group, already faced discrimination from Soviet authorities. Buryats mainly adhere to the Buddhist religion, which was persecuted by Soviet authorities from 1925 onwards in the form of closing down monasteries and exiling Lamas.

As a result of Soviet policies, several Buryats openly revolted against Soviet authorities and many fled to Mongolia (many of which were later killed by communist Mongolian authorities). The uprising was swiftly put down by the Red Army, and around 35,000 Buryats were killed.

Between 1927 and 1928, 10,000 people were murdered by Soviet authorities in Buryatia in an attempt to eliminate growing Buryat nationalism and pan-Mongolism.
