= Twenty-five-thousander =

1930 Soviet urban migrant to rural collective farms

Twenty-five-thousanders (Russian: двадцатипятитысячники, dvadtsatipyatitysyachniki) was a collective name for the frontline workers from the major industrial cities of the Soviet Union who voluntarily left their urban homes for rural areas at the call of the All-Union Communist Party (Bolsheviks) to improve the performance of kolkhozes during the agricultural collectivisation in the Soviet Union in early 1930.

In November 1929, the plenum of the Central Committee of the Communist Party issued a decree on sending 25,000 workers with sufficient organizational and political experience to the rural areas to work in kolkhozy and in Machine and Tractor Stations (MTS). The decree found a broad response among the workers of the country, but they often had to fight resistance from their factories, which needed them to fill production quotas. In her history of the movement, Lynne Viola wrote:

The recruitment drive illustrated the sometimes contradictory nature of the first five-year plan revolution, which aimed for the maximum in economic modernization while at the same time insisting that modernization occur within the parameters of the social and political guidelines of the proletarian dictatorship. The factories were required to increase production while releasing their best workers for participation in the numerous mobilizations of skilled workers for promotion in the bureaucracy, the purge of the state administration, enrollment in higher technical education, and work in the countryside. The consequences of these contradictory demands were frequently inconsistency, disorder, and an uneasy balance between different institutional concerns, revealing a side of Soviet politics lacking unity of purpose and divided by differing interests. In the recruitment of the 25,000ers this meant that ultimately the state had to circumvent factory officialdom and, with the aid of the party organs, appeal directly to workers over the head of resistant factory officials for support in the campaign. And the result was that, in spite of the opposition of factory officials and problems in campaign implementation, the recruitment drive was an enormous success.

As a result, 27,519 people were selected from all over the Soviet Union and sent to work in the kolkhozy.

Analysis of the social structure of 23,409 twenty-five-thousanders with personal files reveals:

- Males - 92.3%, females - 7.7%
- Members of the CPSU - 69.9%
- Members of the Komsomol - 8.6%
- Members of the Metal Workers Union - approx. 16,000
- Individuals with no party affiliation - 21.5%
- Up to 5 years of work experience - 13%
- 5 to 12 years of work experience - 39%
- More than 12 years of work experience - 48%

To prepare the twenty-five-thousanders for work in the rural areas, the Soviets organized special courses. Some volunteers were sent to sovkhozy for two or three months as interns. Most of the twenty-five-thousanders were sent directly to kolkhozy in the principal cereal regions of the country, such as Ukraine, North Caucasus, Lower and Middle Volga, the Black Earth Region and others.

The twenty-five-thousanders took part in establishing new kolkhozy and in strengthening the weak ones, conducting political, educational and cultural work among the inhabitants of the rural areas. They assisted kolkhozy in organizing stock, strengthening work-discipline and establishing "correct" product-distribution. Some of the twenty-five-thousanders were elected board members and chairmen of kolkhozy.

However, the twenty-five-thousanders encountered fierce resistance from the so-called kulaks, who opposed the socialist re-organization of agriculture.

Soviet literature treated the phenomenon of the twenty-five-thousanders extensively. Mikhail Sholokhov wrote one of the most famous books on this subject: Virgin Soil Upturned (Russian: Поднятая целина, romanized: Podnyataya tselina, 1932 and 1960).

== See also ==
- Virgin Lands Campaign
