= Soviet famine of 1946–1947 =

The Soviet famine of 1946–1947 was a major famine in the Soviet Union. It was also the last famine in Soviet and Russian history.

The estimates of victim numbers vary, ranging from several hundred thousand to 2 million. Recent estimates from historian Cormac Ó Gráda, state that 900,000 perished during the famine. Regions that were especially affected included the Ukrainian SSR with 300,000 dead, and the Moldavian SSR with 100,000 dead. Other parts of the Soviet Union such as the Russian SFSR and the Byelorussian SSR were also affected with 500,000 deaths. Elsewhere, malnutrition was widespread but famine was averted. The famine is notable for very high levels of child mortality.

The famine has been attributed in part to the effects of World War II, and in part on government policy. The war had destroyed part of the country's agricultural infrastructure, and the post-war demobilization of the Soviet troops is thought to have caused a new baby boom. The increase of the population at the time of an already ongoing food shortage was one of the causes of the famine. A severe drought in 1946 resulted in a poor harvest, while the Soviet government raised the food prices and made food unaffordable. The government continued exporting food during the famine, and declined to seek international assistance.

== Causes ==
Several leading causes of the famine have been identified by historians.

- World War II resulted in massive infrastructural damage, especially in the agriculture in the west of the country, as well as over 25 million deaths among the Soviet citizenry. The return of demobilized troops from the war resulted in a concurrent spike in births that the system was unprepared for. The hardships of the war, especially food shortages, lasted beyond August 1945 and were still pressing issues in summer of 1946.
- The drought of 1946 stifled the desperately needed recovery of Soviet agriculture, and resulted in a harvest significantly lower than the harvest of 1945. The drought was described as the most severe since 1891.
- The Soviet government was overzealous in its determination to advance economic reform, and reduced eligibility to ration cards in late 1946, while at the same time raising food prices.
- To avoid the appearance of global weakness, the Soviet government continued food exports and declined to seek international assistance.

The famine peaked in early 1947 and declined in severity over the course of the year. After the reasonably successful harvest of 1947, mass starvation disappeared by the beginning of 1948. The Great Plan for the Transformation of Nature was adopted by the Soviet government in late 1948 in response to the famine.

In Soviet historiography, the 1946–1947 famine has been largely overshadowed by the previous 1930–1933 famine, and it took until the 1990s for the 1946–1947 famine to receive notable historiographical attention.

== Background ==
The Soviet famine was the third and final of the major Soviet famines which occurred between the 1920s and the 1940s.

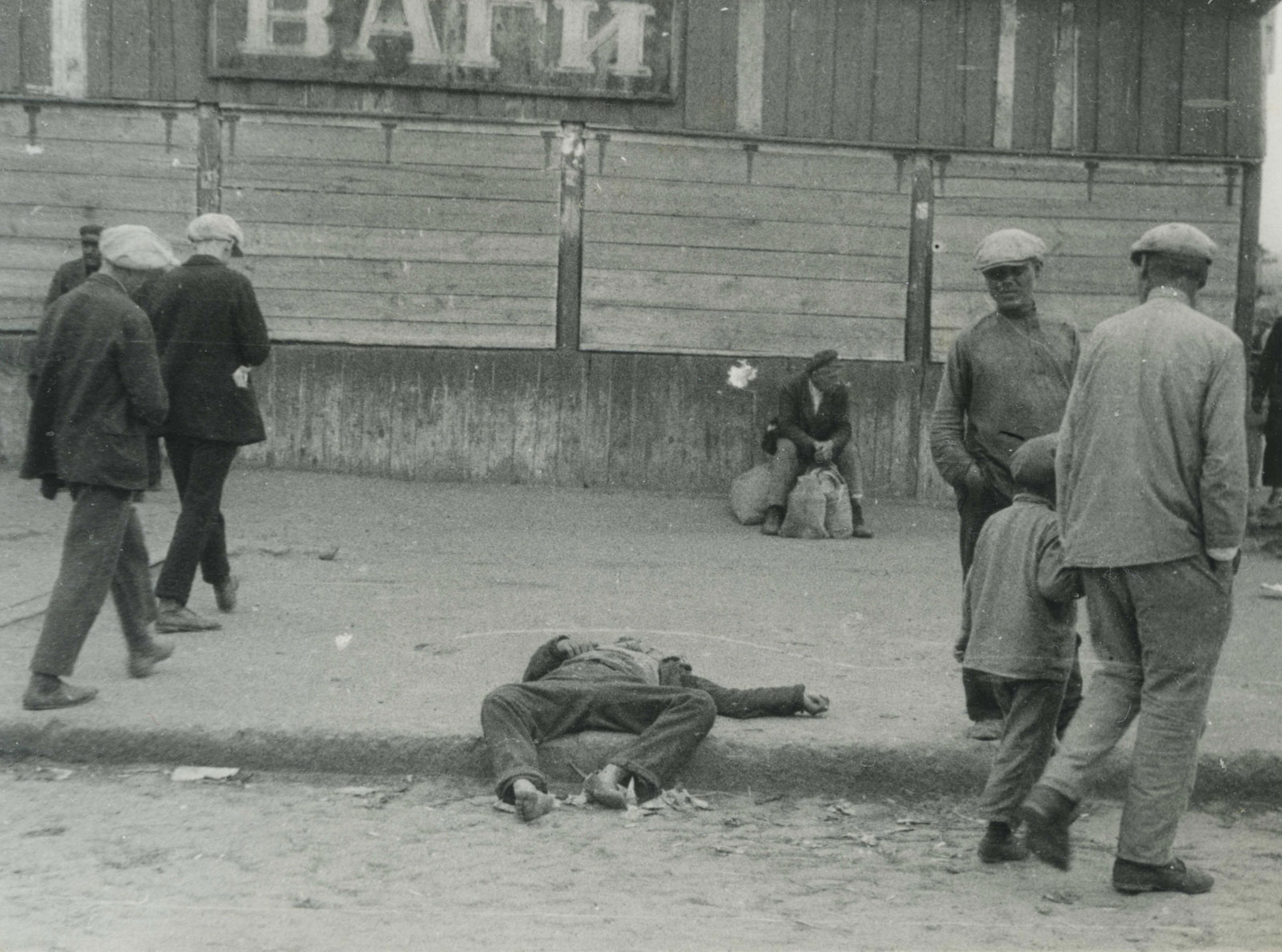
Famine victim during the Holodomor, 1933

This "triune famine" resulted in millions of casualties by starvation, and it also left lasting cultural and economic scars on the affected regions. Michael Ellman counts the time which spanned the years from 1941 to 1945, during World War II, as its own famine, which would make the famine of 1946–1947 the fourth rather than the third major famine. The second major famine, which mainly lasted from 1930 to 1933, has attracted considerable attention. Sometimes called the Holodomor or the "terror famine," the proceedings of this famine which occurred across most of the Soviet Union, most notably in the Ukrainian SSR were recognized as a genocide by the government of Ukraine in 2006, and since then, they have been recognized as a genocide by the governments of several other countries. The Soviet state had received considerable international aid during the Russian famine of 1921–1922 from the American Relief Administration (ARA) and other organizations. While the Soviet Union had accepted this help in July 1921, it did not request or accept any large scale assistance in 1932–1933, and would again fail to request foreign assistance in 1946–1947.

While each famine had elements which made it unique, all three of them were partially aggravated by the ideologically driven government policy of the Lenin and Stalin governments, such as grain requisitioning, red trains, or forced economic collectivization.

Several main reasons for the famine of 1946–1947 have been identified by historians: The devastation caused by World War II, the 1946 drought, the lack of autonomy of the Soviet peasantry, and the Soviet government's inability to implement effective policies to counteract the starvation and the famine.

=== The impact of World War II ===
The Soviet Union was engaged on the Eastern Front of World War II between 1941 and 1945, and suffered more than 25 million casualties.

While the three major Soviet famines (1921–1922, 1930–1933, 1946–1947) are often seen as parts of a greater whole ("triune famine"), there is a major difference between the 1930–1933 famine and the other two. Both the 1921–1922 and the 1946–1947 famines were immediately preceded by massively damaging major military conflicts, the Russian Civil War (and World War I) and World War II, respectively. Military demobilization concurrently resulted in a large number of unemployed soldiers, disabled veterans in need of government support, and a birth spike as the soldiers returned to their wives.

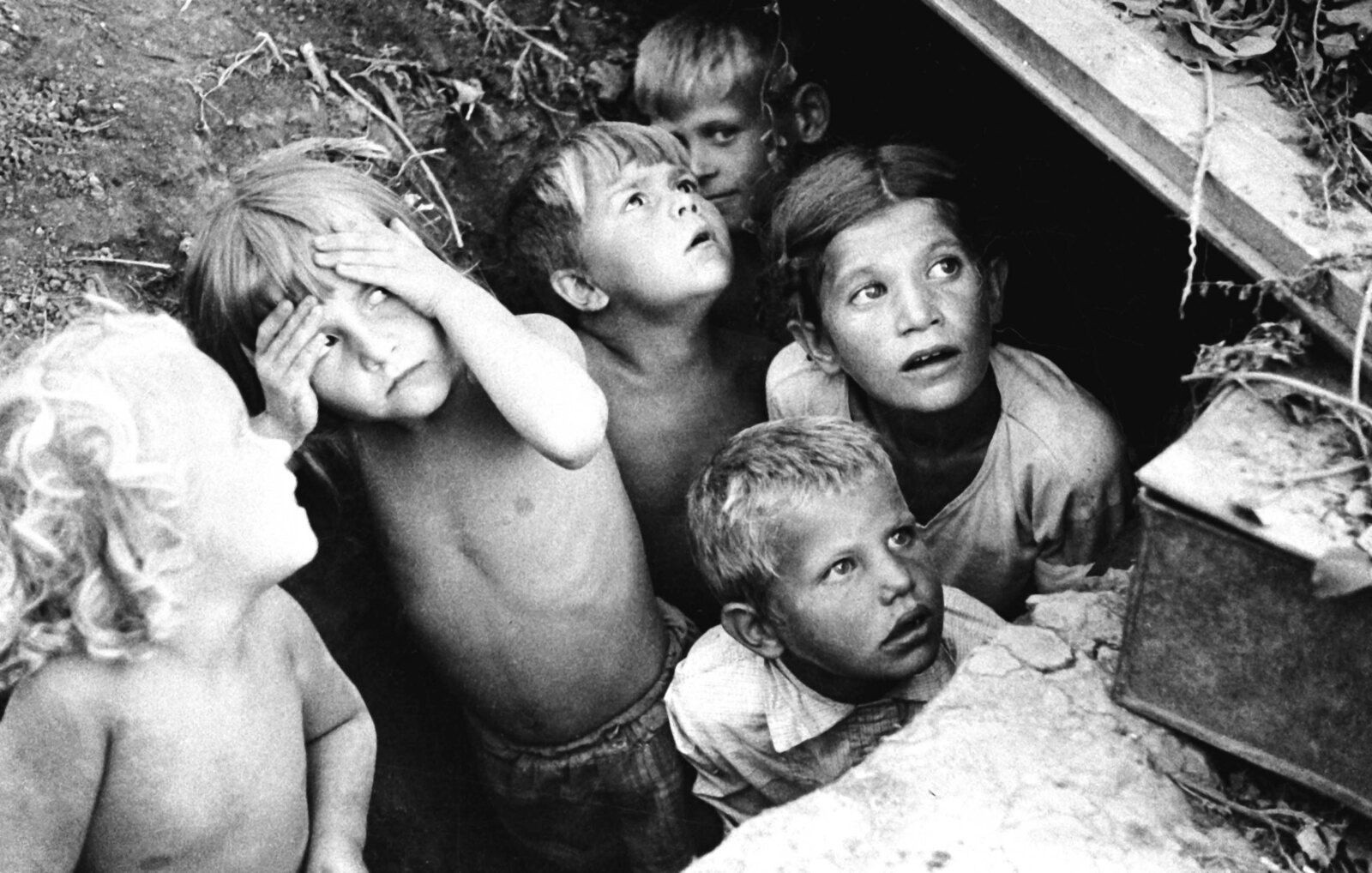
Soviet children during a Luftwaffe air raid, 1941

Additionally, the war had left the children in the USSR particularly vulnerable. Many had lost both parents, and many more had lost their fathers. Hundreds of thousands were homeless, and hundreds of thousands more were dependent on single mothers for survival. The crisis of young parents led to large numbers of parents abandoning their children, and children became one of the primary victim demographics of the famine.

Mobilization during World War II had taken large amounts of manpower out of civilian employment, including agricultural labor, and even after demobilization, many soldiers struggled to find employment. Military demobilization also resulted in a birth spike as the young men returned home, and the number of births per 1,000 people increased from 15.9 in 1945 to 24.9 in 1946, thus greatly increasing the number of children under the age of twelve months (who would be among the main groups of starvation deaths in the famine). The Central Statistical Directorate (TsSU) registered 4.1 million births in 1946 and another 4.5 million in 1947. Additionally, there were constant bureaucratic conflicts between members of the military and the civilian world, notably doctors and nurses, as the Red Army was slow to vacate buildings it had occupied (notably hospitals) during the war. In the Ukrainian SSR alone, 129 buildings that officially belonged to the Ministry of Health were still occupied by other institutions on 1 January 1946, most usually the military.

Many children in the Soviet Union were left orphaned by the war, with many other losing one of their parents (usually the fathers). These besprizornyye (беспризорные, "homeless") became a massive societal and economic problem, with 36,000 homeless children wandering the streets of Moscow alone at the beginning of 1945. The Soviet government worked with the patronat (патронат, "protectorship") program to house orphaned children, housing some 600,000 during the war years, but the number of hungry children was still increasing.

The war had disrupted regular access to a secure food supply for many Soviet citizens, especially those under German occupation or caught in protracted sieges (most famously the Siege of Leningrad), and many tens of thousands were threatened by starvation even in August 1945, as the war was concluding. Even industrial workers, who were ideologically the favored class in Soviet society, complained that their nutrition was not improving even as the war was ending. Bread shortages persisted throughout 1945 and into 1946, and difficulties in the food supply were not isolated local incidents, but a large-scale systemic problem to feed the population.

Payment and wages, which were partially given in grain and partially in money, had also stagnated or declined. In various areas, particularly the Ukrainian SSR and the Saratov Oblast within the Russian SFSR, these declines were massive. Only a handful of areas, like the Armenian SSR, saw workers' pay increase from 1940 to 1945.

Worker pay by region
Average amount of grain and money distributed to collective farmers per earned workday per region
| Region | | Grain (kg) | | Money (rubles) | |
| Region | | 1940 | 1945 | 1940 | 1945 |
|---|---|---|---|---|---|
| Russian SFSR | At-large | 1.6 | 0.6 | 0.64 | 0.61 |
| Russian SFSR | Saratov Oblast | 2.9 | 0.7 | 0.6 | 0.42 |
| Russian SFSR | Altai Krai | 0.8 | 0.4 | 0.86 | 0.88 |
| Russian SFSR | Krasnodar Krai | 1.4 | 0.8 | 1.35 | 1.61 |
| Russian SFSR | Ryazan Oblast | 1.1 | 0.6 | 0.28 | 0.29 |
| Russian SFSR | Kalinin Oblast | 1.6 | 1.1 | 0.41 | 0.97 |
| Russian SFSR | Voronezh Oblast | 1.5 | 0.4 | 0.47 | 0.29 |
| Ukrainian SSR | | 2.2 | 0.5 | 1.16 | 0.61 |
| Uzbek SSR | | 0.3 | 0.5 | 2.57 | 2.55 |
| Kazakh SSR | | 1.3 | 0.8 | 0.97 | 1.12 |
| Georgian SSR | | 1.9 | 2.5 | 1.98 | 4.08 |
| Azeri SSR | | 2.0 | 2.3 | 2.14 | 1.95 |
| Kyrgyz SSR | | 1.6 | 0.8 | 1.59 | 1.03 |
| Tajik SSR | | 1.8 | 1.2 | 3.16 | 2.31 |
| Armenian SSR | | 1.8 | 2.2 | 1.88 | 2.75 |
| Turkmen SSR | | 0.4 | 0.9 | 3.39 | 2.79 |

=== Weather conditions and drought ===
In 1946, the Soviet Union was affected by a drought. The Soviet government called the 1946 drought the worst drought in Russia since 1891, although such claims have proven difficult to unambiguously prove or dismiss. Regardless of the comparative severity of the drought of 1946, it is beyond dispute that the summer of 1946 was extremely dry, and international observers such as Alexander Werth and the British Foreign Office noted the difficulties inflicted by the harsh weather on the peasantry. The weather was a stark contrast from the war years, during which, with perhaps 1943 the only exception, weather conditions had been favorable to crop production.

=== Transformation of agriculture and the peasantry ===
Agriculture and the role of the peasantry were decisively changed during the Stalin era. Not only had the Soviet famine of 1930–1933, and the Holodomor that was a regional part of it, massively affected the peasantry, the smaller towns and villages of the Soviet Union also remained in significant economic poverty, as Soviet economic growth and investments were greatly disproportionately favorable towards heavy industry. The war took manpower out of the countryside, and resulted in massive material damages. The number of agricultural implements and tractors was greatly reduced from 1940 in 1946.

A Frenchman who was [...] sent in error to a camp for political prisoners in Siberia [...] said that political prisoners were used to compensate the extreme shortage of draught animals. He himself had been made to drag ploughs and cars.

— British Embassy in Moscow (8 July 1946), [Ganson 2009: p. 14]

Soviet agriculture suffered as a result of the material damages and the manpower losses incurred by the war. Comparing the number of available agricultural implements in 1946 to the amount of 1941, plows had gone to 62%, cultivators to 61%, sowing machines to 62%, harvesters and sheaf tiers to 55%, mowers to 61%, threshing machines to 64%, and combines to 81%. The number of available work animals also plummeted. Compared to prewar levels, collective farms in Ukraine went to 69% of their large horned cattle (cows: 30%), 27% of pigs, and 35% of sheep and goats. To make up for the severe shortage of work animals, the Soviet government deployed political prisoners. The hardships of war had also left their impact on the diversity (or lack thereof) in nutrition, and most Soviet families survived on diets that almost entirely consisted of bread and potatoes, with only little fruit, vegetables, or proteins. The lack of mechanization in Soviet agriculture, ever a pressing issue under both the governments of Lenin and Stalin, was now especially painful to the government. The number of tractors at machine tractor stations (MTSs) declined by a quarter, from 435,000 to 327,000, between 1941 and 1946. The amount of horsepower provided by the tractors declined to 71% of the 1941 level, from 8,359,000 to 5,917,000. The number of horses collapsed to 46% of the 1941 value in 1946, the number of draught cattle at collective farms to 95%, the number of automobiles at MTS and collective farms to 16% (at collective farms only: 4.7% (107,000 to 5,000)).

With private agricultural production growing in importance during the war, some peasants had grown small private fortunes feeding the cities. Economic analysis of the situation (of both urban and rural populations), as well as of purchasing power held by the civilian population, is made harder by the extreme shortage of goods reducing the overall accessibility of consumer goods.

=== Government policies ===
Joseph Stalin, Soviet leader from 1924 to 1953

As had already happened in the 1930s, the Soviet government in the 1940s once again undertook large-scale grain exports in spite of the growing food shortages. The Fourth five-year plan demanded grain exports, and the Soviet Union was at times supported by the Western powers in this endeavor. In March 1946, the United States provided ships to carry 600,000 tons of grain to France. Between 1946 and 1948, a total of 5.7 million tons of grain (excluding cereals), were exported from the USSR. The Soviet Union saw itself in an ideological and geostrategic competition with the U.S. in regards to food relief, and did not want to look outdone. While most countries that received American and Soviet assistance avoided famine, the USSR itself did not.

Apart from the continued export of food, the Soviet government also failed to make use of all available methods of food import. Food requisitions in the Soviet occupation zone (the later East Germany) were cut back at the height of the Soviet famine.

After 1945, the Soviet government attempted sweeping monetary and economic reforms (which eventually led into the monetary reform of 1947). The Soviet economy was under pressure because of several factors, including a critically undersupplied consumers' market, a growing economy of natural exchange, inflationary pressures and the devaluation of the ruble, and decreases in government revenue after the abolition of the emergency wartime tax and the voluntary Red Army fund. A major example of such policies was the state reconstruction and development bond. Issued in May 1946, this bond was issued in a size of 20 billion rubles. The bond, which came along with pressure on employees by employers and party cadres, proved to be deeply unpopular. With the state reconstruction and development bond underway after May 1946, the Soviet government additionally pushed for serious monetary reform to restore the value of the ruble. A critical step towards this objective was the abolition of the wartime ration system, which had with its fixed prices and hidden inflation (the reduction of quality of a product rather than the increase of its price) seriously undermined the health of the Soviet economy. The abolition of the ration system was hoped by Soviet leaders to represent an economically powerful and diplomatically sovereign Soviet Union, and was pushed at a time when several countries, including the United Kingdom and France, much richer and much less devastated by the war, still were relying on ration cards as well.

== History ==
=== General history ===
Early breakdowns in the food distribution system were already visible by December 1945 and January 1946, where bread quality was decreasing and waiting times in front of stores and bakeries grew. Economic goals for food production were unrealistically high, and the bread factories at times fell several tons short of the daily production goals over weeklong periods. Fuel shortages additionally slowed deliveries. In early December 1945, the food distributions at time stayed at under 50% of the planned levels. Over the course of early 1946, the grain stocks and food reserves of the local and regional institutions dwindled. Beginning in January 1946, several raions replaced flour distribution with grain distribution, and redirected low-quality food intended for farm animals towards human consumption.

A second series of severe interruptions in the food supply occurred in March to April 1946, partially caused by a government reduction in commercial prices of various food staples that was issued on 26 February 1946. This second wave of shortages, which had begun in March, continued into April 1946, as well as partially into May and June. In May 1946, the Soviet government further advanced towards the abolition of the ration system by issuing the state reconstruction and development bond. This reform proved deeply unpopular, and the accelerated pace at which the Soviet Union was rushing towards the abolition of ration cards (still in use in France and Britain, among other countries), left many civilians that were desperately dependent on rations at the threat of starvation.

The food shortages, which had plagued Soviet cities since the war, were exacerbated by the lack of rainfall in early-to-mid 1946, leading to the drought of 1946. The drought negatively affected all harvest yields, and reduced grain and potato yields by more than 60% each.

In September 1946, the Council of Ministers and the Central Committee began the "campaign to economize on bread", raising ration prices for bread. While some wage increases were passed alongside the ration prices, these did not nearly make up the difference in the increased food prices. The Soviet government controversially continued to export food to foreign countries even in the face of famine. Over the course of the year 1946, domestic food shortage had forced several closures among even state enterprises. The public response to the new measures was overwhelmingly negative. Some citizens accepted the reforms as a necessary evil to counteract a threat of war against the UK or the US, while others blamed vindictive forces inside the CPSU (although not usually Stalin). Discontent with the government began to unload itself in occasional local strikes.

On 27 September 1946, the government and the Central Committee issued another joint decree, titled "On Economizing in the Consumption of Grain", beginning the "bread-conservation campaign". The decree went into force on 1 October 1946 and reduced the number of people that were entitled to ration cards. The cutbacks on the ration system happened at a time when many of the ration recipients desperately depended on the ration cards for their survival, and when rationing was still in usage even in several countries much richer and less devastated by war than the Soviet Union. The government's decision in late September to intensify grain requisitioning was another crushing blow to the conditions in the countryside and the villages, and the policy of grain confiscation at any price to human life was the primary and dominant factor that preceded the explosive growth of famine deaths after December 1946.

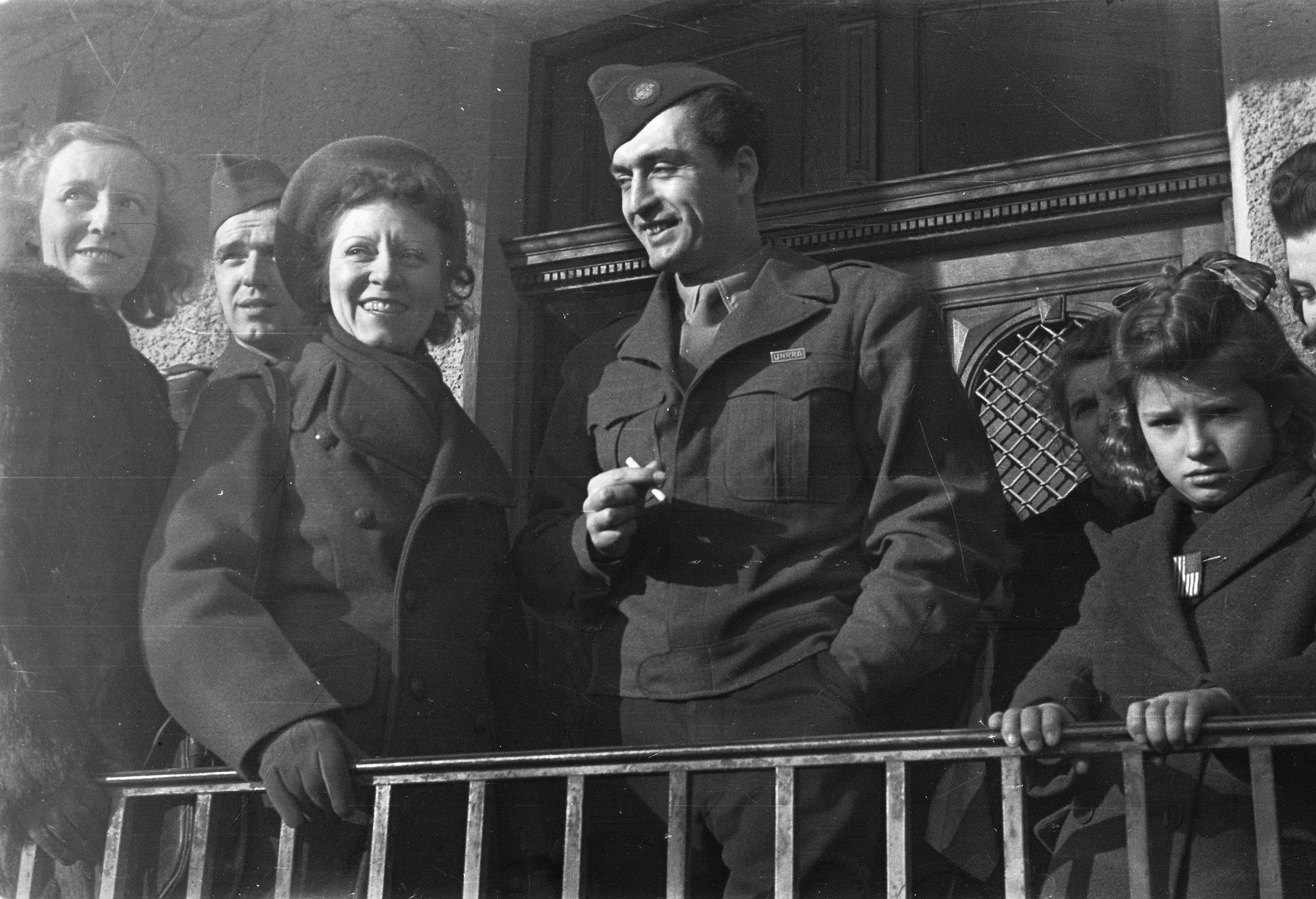
U.S. Army soldier serving with the UNRRA in the Netherlands, in 1946

The Soviet Red Cross and Red Crescent was active throughout the entire famine (as well as during the months preceding it), providing medical treatments, distributing food and clothing, and constructing local infrastructure. While the effort by SRCRC aid workers on the ground were genuine and well-intentioned, the organization often ran into bureaucratic and financial impasses, and at times even faced obstruction from the Soviet government. Another organization that was of great importance to the relief effort was the United Nations Relief and Rehabilitation Administration (UNRRA), which was especially active in Ukraine and Belarus before it was forced to cease operations in early 1947.

The government came to the decision in October 1946 to reduce retail trade in bread, and the amount of available bread was reduced by tens of thousands of tons. At the same time, the quality of the bread was scaled back. The growing discontent among the civilian population was registered by the Soviet secret services, who intercepted a growing number of civilians' letters voicing discontent and desperation.

In December 1946, famine began to appear on a large scale in the state farm apparatus. The government failed to react in a way that quickly distributed grain reserves among the population. By 1 January 1947, state agencies possessed 11.8 million tons of grain (a reduction by 3.6 million tons from 1 January 1946), but this was not all available to meet the needs of the population, as parts of the grain load were marked up for export, as transitional grain stocks, or as inviolable reserves (for the case of another war). Early-to-mid 1947 was the high point of casualties during the famine. Deaths reached a first peak in March 1947, then a second peak in May and June 1947, and declined afterwards.

In early 1947, the UNRRA was forced to cease operations on American pressure. The U.S. government was aware of the scale of desperation in the Soviet Union, but used the fact that the Soviet government failed to publicly appeal for aid to instead reroute American relief and aid towards projects such as the Marshall Plan.

The population groups that continued to be most affected by the famine were children, the elderly, the unemployed, the disabled (including war invalids), and those who were employed in non-manual jobs (such as teachers and clerks). The famine drastically affected the homeless and orphaned children in the Soviet Union, and forced many parents to abandon their infants. Children were one of the most affected demographics, and toddlers and infants especially feature prominently among famine fatalities.

In summer 1947, rumors spread that ration prices would once again rise on 15 July, leading to yet another run on the stores and the banks.

The famine lessened in severity after the summer of 1947, and conditions improved after the 1947 harvest, as well as the cancellation of rationing in December 1947. The end of rationing had long been expected by the civilian population, with divided opinions on whether the outcome would be positive or negative. Much more surprising to the general public was that December 1947 also saw the finalization of the 1947 monetary reforms in the country, including a currency reform to curb inflation.

The economic recovery after the monetary reforms was unequal across the country. Whereas the major cities rapidly progressed towards subsistence and eventually surplus levels of consumer goods availability, the consumers' market remained in a critical states in non-urban environments. In some villages, rationing was sometimes locally reintroduced, either directly in the form of ration cards, or more covertly in the shape of booklets or other documents handling access to the market. Many civilians in the countryside or medium-size towns complained bitterly to local officials or in letters to newspapers like Pravda about their conditions.

While the provisions crisis would continue into 1948, the main phase of famine had concluded. The end of rationing in late 1947, although it had been eagerly anticipated by many Soviet civilians, did not bring about the drastic positive change that many had hoped for. Instead, the economic and nutritional improvements were gradual, especially outside of the major cities. Demographic data indicates that famine as a mass phenomenon had ended by the beginning of 1948. Bread shortages lasted into 1948 (and in fact into 1949 and 1950 as well), and some cities like Novosibirsk had serious problems properly restoring their bread supply, leading to public violence and riots. Several cities saw the militsiya deployed to break up fights and unrest in the lines before stores.

On 20 October 1948, the Soviet government adopted the Great Plan for the Transformation of Nature in response to the damages of the drought and famine.

=== Victimology and death toll ===
The exact number of victims is hard to determine, and victim numbers have been estimated at different levels.

- At least 500,000. This estimation is notable, as it is made in the Black Book of Communism, a publication that has been heavily criticized for its otherwise very uncharitable depiction of Soviet history, but ends up being of the lower mainstream estimations of the famine's death toll.
- 900,000 (Ó Gráda, 2019) with 500,000 deaths in the RSFSR and the BSSR, 200,000 in the UkSSR and 100,000 in the MSSR.
- Around 1 million (Timothy D. Snyder: Bloodlands, 2010).
- Around 1 million. (Isupov, 2000)
- 1 to 2 million. (Ganson, 2009)
- 2 million, (Zima, 1996) with at least 500,000 deaths by starvation in the RSFSR alone.

Assuming a number of just over 1 million victims, this makes the 1946–1947 somewhat equivalent in absolute numbers to the more conservative mortality estimates of the 1921–1922 famine, but both famines remain overshadowed by the death toll of the 1932–1933 famines, where even the lowest estimates generally stay over a number of at least 5 million deaths.

Demographic work, especially when comparing the 1946–1947 famine to the other Soviet famines, is made very difficult due to the damages done by World War II, including in direct human casualties or in indirect damage done to the efficiency of administrative bureaucracy and their data. It thus becomes difficult to differentiate between people who died in or as a result of World War II or those who died in the famine. Mortality peaked in early 1947. Of particular note among the victims of the famine were the elderly, as well as young children. There was also a spike in suicides.

=== Drought and harvest failures ===
Yields of various food crops, 100 kg/hectare
| Crop | 1940 | 1945 | 1946 | 1946 compared to | |
| Crop | 1940 | 1945 | 1946 | 1940 | 1945 |
|---|---|---|---|---|---|
| Grains | 10.7 | 7.8 | 6.9 | 64% | 88% |
| Sunflower | 9.4 | 6.2 | 5.2 | 56% | 83% |
| Sugar beet | 170 | 106 | 73 | 42% | 68% |
| Potato | 118 | 86 | 81 | 69% | 94% |

The 1946 harvest of all major food crops collapsed. Grains were 64%, sunflowers 56%, sugar beets 42%, and potatoes 69% of the harvest of 1940.

Soviet expansion after World War II expanded the harvest areas, but the 1946 harvest was still the second-lowest harvest in Soviet history.

The total amount of grain harvested in the Soviet countryside (39.6 million tons) was the second lowest amount in Soviet history, only ahead of the 1921 harvest (36.2 million tons). However, the 1946 harvest was farmed on a bigger area than the 1921 harvest, as the Soviet Union had in the meantime annexed the Baltic States, Bessarabia and Bucovina, as well as eastern Poland, thus increasing the amount of land to harvest. As pointed out by historian Stephen G. Wheatcroft, exact statements about Soviet grain yields at the time are made more difficult by the thorough falsification of Soviet government statistics, some of which were taken as authentic by other historians.

The famine's effects declined over the course of mid-to-late 1947, and conditions were improved after a reasonably successful harvest in fall of 1947, as well as the cancellation of rationing in December 1947. The end of rationing had long been expected by the civilian population, with divided opinions on whether the outcome would be positive or negative. Much more surprising to the general public than the abolition of rationing was the fact that December 1947 also saw the finalization of the 1947 monetary reforms in the country, including a currency reform to curb inflation.

=== Impact on children ===
Child mortality was massive during the famine, with hundreds of thousands of children dying before their first birthday. The situation of children, especially of the homeless youths (besprizornyye), was drastically worsened during the famine years. The number of homeless children, which had declined from 341,134 in 1944 to 296,432 in 1945, once again grew, to 323,422 in 1946 and to 360,000 (very likely an estimate rather than a headcount) in 1947. The immense scale of the crisis for young children (including those who were orphaned and those whose parents were themselves starving and turned to the childcare system for assistance) forced the childcare facilities to at times decide which children would live and which ones would have to be turned away.

The number of hungry children increased drastically during the last four months of 1946, when food shortages worsened, and the amount of besprizornyye accepted at government checkpoints increased by more than 25%, to 103,923. Additionally, the number of vagabond children picked up at railroad stations or along railway lines (coming from different backgrounds, including unhoused orphans, children who had fled children's homes, child labourers who had deserted their workplace, etc.) increased from 57,260 (Q2, 1946) to 77,291 (Q3, 1946).

A significant number of child deaths were foundlings abandoned by their parents. Most child fatalities happened within a month of admission to the childcare system, as many children entered the hospitals or nursing homes at states of hunger and dystrophy that were already desperate.

The infrastructure for children's medical care improved over the course of the year 1947, adding 2,103 infants' home beds in the RSFSR, and 5,901 infants' home beds in Ukraine in the first four months of 1947 alone, along with 4,639 children's hospital beds over the course of the entire year, but the sheer scale of the crisis of children, both those who were orphaned vagabonds and those whose parents were so poor that they turned to the children's hospitals and childcare facilities for emergency assistance, forced the children's homes and hospitals to at times turn away children in need of assistance. This was not helped by governmental austerity policies: In the third quarter 1947, Gosplan lowered the number of meals to be provided to nurseries in Ukraine from 72,000 to 61,200, at a time when these meals were desperately needed.

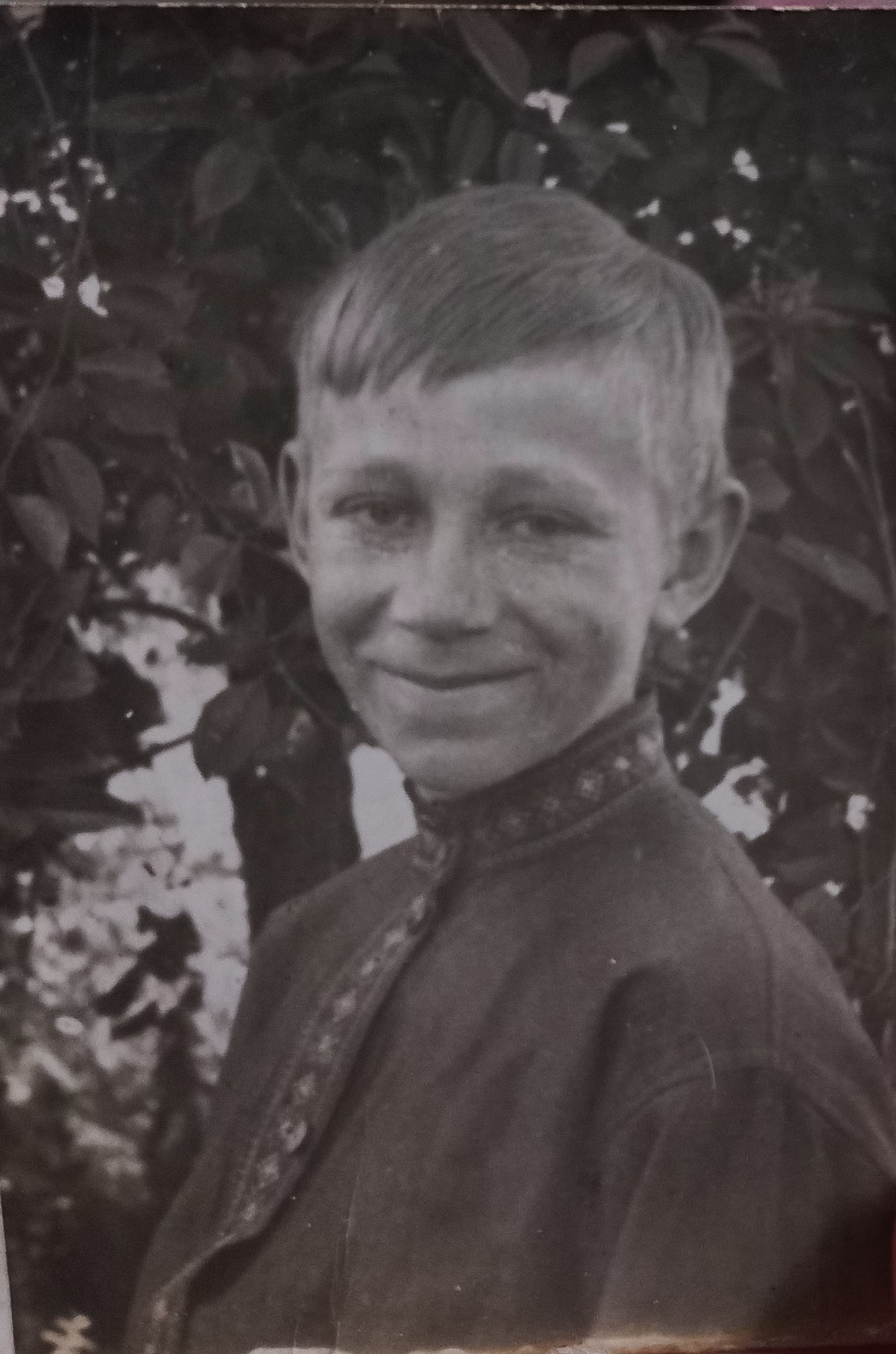
Dmytro Kravtsov

A vivid example of one of the dead children from Ukraine is the biography of Dmytro Kravtsov (1932-1946). He lived in the village of Novooleksandrivka, Kirovohrad oblast, his father, Panas Kravtsov, a participant in the Winter War and the Second World War, was deported to Kamchatka on a falsified by NKVD case. Dmytro died at the age of 14 from the starvation in 1946 and the stress suffered during bombing.

The infrastructure of children's nursing homes and hospitals was negatively affected by the "bread-conversation" campaign that the government started in October 1946, as the reduction of food and staff in the state-provided health service threatened the childcare system, which had been ambitiously planned to expand considerably in 1947, with severe understaffing.

=== Economic history ===
After 1945, the Soviet government attempted sweeping monetary and economic reforms (which eventually led into the monetary reform of 1947). The Soviet economy was under pressure because of several factors, including a critically undersupplied consumers' market, a growing economy of natural exchange, inflationary pressures and the devaluation of the ruble, and decreases in government revenue after the abolition of the emergency wartime tax and the voluntary Red Army fund.

On 26 February 1946, the Soviet government issued a reduction in commercial prices of various food staples. It was hoped that a reduction in prices on official sources of food would curb black market activity and disperse speculation. The objective was achieved, and bread costs in some oblasts fell by more than 50%, and several food products became more attainable for citizens. The government opened 600 stores in 250 cities on the first day of the reform, hoping to stem the predicted tide of new consumers, but failed to cope with the large demand. Bread lines as long as 500 to 600 people outside of some of the new stores were recorded in cities such as Gorky (Nizhny Novgorod) and Molotov (Perm). All the newly available bread in Stalingrad (Volgograd) was sold out in two hours. In March 1946, Soviet cities that were affected by significant food shortages included Molotov, Arkhangelsk, Kotlas, Kirovgrad, Izmail, Sambir, Drogobychi, Lipetsk, Borisoglebsk, and Ust-Kamenogorsk (Oskemen). Cities around the entire union were affected by bread distribution breakdowns, but tight clusters of such incidents were especially notable in southern Ukraine, northwestern Belarus, and southwestern Russia.

A major example of Soviet economic policies in the immediate postwar period was the state reconstruction and development bond. Issued in May 1946, this bond was issued in a size of 20 billion rubles. The bond, which came along with pressure on employees by employers and party cadres, proved to be deeply unpopular. With the state reconstruction and development bond underway after May 1946, the Soviet government additionally pushed for serious monetary reform to restore the value of the ruble. A critical step towards this objective was the preparation for the abolition of the wartime ration system, which had with its fixed prices and hidden inflation (the reduction of quality of a product rather than the increase of its price) seriously undermined the health of the Soviet economy. The abolition of the ration system was hoped by Soviet leaders to represent an economically powerful and diplomatically sovereign Soviet Union, and was pushed at a time when several countries, including the United Kingdom and France, much richer and much less devastated by the war, still were relying on ration cards as well.

Over the course of summer, the advancing drought and the further agricultural impasses that resulted from it turned the economic situation in the Soviet Union to one of outright desperation, especially in the villages and the countryside, as well as small to middle-sized towns.

Soviet grain exports, 1946 to 1948
| | 1946 | 1947 | 1948 |
|---|---|---|---|
| Soviet grain exports.: Millions of tons.; Excludes cereals. | 1.7 | 0.8 | 3.2 |

In spite of the scepticism from local party officials, who were concerned that these reforms would prove unpopular in the face of growing food shortages, the Soviet government controversially continued to export grain to other countries, including France, Bulgaria, Romania, Czechoslovakia, Yugoslavia, and others. The continuation of the grain export policy was specifically criticized by local party officials, who feared growing consumer outrage in the face of the growing contradiction of domestic food shortages with international grain exports to foreign countries. Nonetheless, it must be pointed out that grain exports were at least partially reduced in the face of the growing famine, and dropped significantly from 1946 to 1947.

While grain procurements were reduced in the year-by-year comparison between 1945 and 1946 (from 20.0 million tons in 1945 to 17.5 million tons in 1946 (−12.5%)), the even greater loss of total harvest yield (47.3 million tons in 1945 to 39.6 million tons in 1946 (−16.3%)) meant that even with the reduced grain procurements, individual peasants were left with less food, and procurements went from accounting for 42.3% of the harvest in 1945 to 44.2% in 1946.

In September 1946, the Council of Ministers and the Central Committee began the "campaign to economize on bread", raising ration prices for bread, meaning that the citizens could buy less bread for the same amount of money. While compensation was attempted by lowering the price of commercially sold bread (a substantially more expensive category), the prices of ration bread doubled or even tripled, whereas commercial prices decreased by only between 10% and 20%.

Wage increases (between +60 rubles and +110 rubles a month, with the highest raises given to those who earn 300 rubles a month or less) were insufficient to enable the consumers to keep up with the price hikes. Workers' wages, in both grain and money, had barely increased (and often decreased, depending on region) since 1940. Introduction of these economic reforms was scheduled for 16 September 1946, and the changes caused significant confusion and concern even among party cadres.

Beginning on 16 September 1946, the frustration over increase of prices began to unload itself in occasional local strikes, for example in Omsk. Some workers also attempted to negotiate with factory leaderships to increase factory outputs and workhours to attain more payment that way, but the Council of Ministers and the Central Committee had preemptively specifically forbidden raises to salary scales or rates of pay.

On 27 September 1946, the government and the Central Committee issued another joint decree, titled "On Economizing in the Consumption of Grain", which furthered public dissatisfaction. This "bread-conservation campaign" (Decree No. 380, 27 September 1946) had been initiated by Stalin in response letters he had received from Boris Dvinski, Minister of Grain Products, on 7 September and 23 September. Dvinski warned Stalin of the catastrophic failure of the harvest of 1946 and warned to maximize the amount and minimize the consumption of available bread.

It seems to me, Comrade Stalin, though perhaps I am mistaken, that our resources allow us to take on the expenses ... to give agriculture a large amount of tractors and agricultural machinery without sacrificing the interests of railway transport, metallurgy, and fuel. This will allow us to very quickly solve our agricultural problems, recover to prewar gross yields of both grain and technical crops in two to three years, bringing an end to shortages of produce and agricultural raw materials in the country, as well as insufficient compensation for workdays earned in collective farms, and seed shortages, and will open the path to progress in animal breeding. Otherwise, bread and produce shortages will severely limit our entire economy.

— Andrey Andreyevich Andreyev, Soviet Minister of Agriculture, October 1946, [Ganson 2009: p. 17]

Andrey Andreyevich Andreyev, then Soviet Minister of Agriculture, pleaded with Stalin in October 1946 to reroute the distribution heavy machinery towards the agricultural sector to assist in the recovery of harvest yields to prewar levels. Stalin, partially receptive to Andreyev's suggestions, called a plenum of the Central Committee of the CPSU for February 1947 to address agricultural problems in the postwar period. At this plenum, it revealed itself that the Soviet government lacked the personnel with the necessary expertise on agricultural issues, as Georgy Malenkov, himself largely ignorant of agriculture, was put in charge of the Agricultural Section of the Central Committee.

The new decree of the "bread-conservation campaign", which went into force on 1 October 1946, reduced the number of people that were entitled to ration cards. This policy particularly affected the rural population, where the workers and administrators of the state farms, the Machine tractor stations (MTSs), and local industrial enterprises were largely kicked out of the ration system. A total of 23 million rural Soviet citizens lost their ration cards, along with another 3.5 million urban citizens (the latter category mainly consisting of adult unemployed dependants). The objective was to reduce the consumption of grain by 520,000 tons over the course of eight months, thus theoretically putting more food at the government's disposal for emergency distribution. The way this was brought was primarily by reducing the number of people eligible to receive food, and by reducing the amount of food allotted to those who were still eligible. The cutbacks on the ration system happened at a time when many of the ration recipients desperately depended on the ration cards for their survival, and when rationing was still in usage even in several countries much richer and less devastated by war than the Soviet Union.

In response to the ejection from the ration system under certain employers, some urban workers attempted to switch profession to find another employer that still used ration cards, and industrial enterprises in Leningrad hired twice as many new employees in October than they had done in September, and some businesses had to turn away applicants because no additional ration cards could be handed out. Many rural workers who lost their rations abandoned their state farm jobs (further hurting agricultural output) and migrated to the cities, looking for employment opportunities that promised access to ration cards. On 30 October 1946, the state planning agency Gosplan was ordered to prepare for another wave of ration card eligibility reductions. The unexpected cutbacks in rationing over the course of October devastated the livelihoods of millions of citizens, especially those in the countryside who were not manual laborers, such as foresters, teachers and medical workers, along with unemployed dependants, such as the elderly or the disabled.

The government's decision in late September to intensify grain requisitioning was another crushing blow to the conditions in the countryside and the villages, and the policy of grain confiscation at any price to human life was the primary and dominant factor that preceded the explosive growth of famine deaths after December 1946. Access to food in the state farm system was often made dependent on the ability to fulfill grain quotas. If the adult laborers failed to fulfill the expected delivery loads on time, they were under threat of losing their access to payments in the form of food, as were their children and unemployed relatives.

The government came to the decision in October 1946 to reduce retail trade in bread by 70,000 tons. The amount of bread traded was subsequently reduced by 35,000 tons in October 1946 and by another 25,000 tons in November 1946. At the same time, the quality of the bread was scaled back: on 1 November 1946, the combined proportion of oats, barley, and corn in bread was raised to 40% (for Moscow and Leningrad: 25%), and popular discontent grew further. Still, public statements of criticism, where they happened, usually avoided criticism of Stalin, and instead blamed a corrupt political class that was using Stalin's stay in Sochi to take power in the major cities.

In December 1946, famine began to appear on a large scale in the state farm apparatus (where the peasant workers lacked access to both the food they themselves produced and the ration cards they would have needed to buy food), although the term "famine" was avoided in official documents in favor of the phrase "provisioning problems". Likewise, the phrasing "starvation" was usually avoided as a cause of death, in favor of terms such as "dystrophy". The Kaluga provincial office sent specific stories to the Central Committee, describing employees of state farms, including widowed mothers and veteran tractor operators, receiving far less than the food they earned by work, and contracting malnutrition-related illnesses as a result. While villages were most affected, urban industrial enterprises in various cities also suffered. By 1 March 1947, 3,789 cases of dystrophy were recorded in the five major factories of the city of Mariupol alone.

In summer 1947, rumors spread that ration prices would once again rise on 15 July, leading to yet another run on the stores and the banks, with civilians attempting to empty their savings accounts and to buy all available food to prepare for the possibilities of a yet harsher time of food shortages.

Much more surprising to the general public than the abolition of rationing was the fact that December 1947 also saw the finalization of the 1947 monetary reforms in the country. A currency reform, designed to curb the inflation of the ruble, was secretly planned (only to be announced on the day of the reform), but the information leaked when local officials opened the orders ahead of time. Some party cadres used the information to spend all of their cash on gold, real estate or other valuables before the currency reform, furthering resentment by the general public after the reveal of the reforms. Nonetheless, the currency reform brought a significant increase in the quality and quantity of consumer goods in stores in the larger cities, and many businesses' inventories began to approach the (comparative) abundance of the prewar era. The newly arrived goods came with some hefty price tags, especially on clothes, shoes, and knitwear, but also on food products. Exotic foods, even if they were available in a store, were usually prohibitively expensive even after the currency reform. The implementation of the currency reform, which was focussed on savings accounts, also caused significant issues for those citizens who had stored their cash at home.

The famine further derailed the post-war economic recovery of the Soviet Union. Civilian living standards remained below prewar levels for a protracted period of time, and only returned to the 1940 levels in 1953, and even after the end of rationing in 1947, sporadic hunger emerged in isolated localities, especially Soviet villages, well into the 1950s. By contrast, urban heavy industry recovered quicker than the countryside, reaching 1940 production levels by 1948, whereas urban light industry and agriculture took until 1949 or 1950. 1940 levels were themselves lowered by the tough times of the Great Famine and Great Purge, but recovery to these prewar levels was an important prestige project for the Soviet government.

=== Relief efforts ===
The Soviet Red Cross and Red Crescent, officially part of the International Red Cross and Red Crescent Movement but effectively controlled by the Soviet government, went to work in a large-scale relief campaign starting in August and September 1946. The SRCRC organized public assistance of hospitals, nursing homes, and orphans, and collected money for those purposes. Between August 1945 and mid-1947, the SRCRC raised a total of 32 million rubles for the public, most of which went toward medical treatment, food, and clothing for orphans and invalids. The SRCRC regularly organized charity events to raise public funds for its projects wherever it met funding impasses. The SRCRC at times faced red tape and obstruction from the government, particularly when they attempted to cooperate on the local or regional levels with clergy and religious groups. Nicholas Ganson concludes: "The central government’s half-hearted support of the relief campaign clearly served as a major impediment to stemming the tide of the famine, and the bread conservation campaign was, in the immediate sense, the main precipitant of hunger."

=== Domestic reactions ===
As news of the imminent price hikes for food spread among the general population in September 1946, some were in disbelief at a policy so apparently in opposition to communist ideology. Others found the scapegoat in the Western powers, believing that a growing threat of war with the UK and US forced the Soviet government to raise grain prices. When on 16 September 1946, the price hike was officially announced, it was publicly explained to be a preparation for the abolition of the ration system. The public explanation made no reference to the ongoing agricultural drought, and the implicit support for the policy by Stalin somewhat appeased those parts of the civilian population that were influenced by the leader's cult of personality.

I have four children as dependents. Three of them are in school. My husband died at the front. In October [1946] I didn’t receive bread cards for the children. What do I do? We have enough vegetables to last us a month. Commercial bread and produce are impossible to get. What do I do? Quit my job as a pedagogue having eleven years of experience? It would be sad. It's a pity. I worked in the Urals for six years without a rest forging victory and now I have to die of hunger in my home village.

— Letter to the RSFSR Education Committee by the female principal of Shemen elementary school (early 1947), [Ganson 2009: p. 37f]

The population groups that continued to be most affected by the famine were children, the elderly, the unemployed, the disabled (including war invalids), and those who were employed in non-manual jobs (such as teachers and clerks). Families with only one breadwinner (usually widowed single mothers whose husbands died in World War II) were particularly affected, as were orphaned children who lost both their parents.

Between November and December 1946, the Ministry of State Security intercepted and copied 4,616 letters in Voronezh Oblast and 3,275 letters in Stalingrad Oblast that were complaining about hunger and malnutrition. With popular frustration about the inability to purchase food came a spike in theft. In fall of 1946, 53,369 people were prosecuted in the USSR for stealing bread, and 36,670 (74.3%) were convicted to prison sentences. Among the total number of those sentenced for various categories of crime in 1946/1947, about 50% were women with young children ("women's crime"). If the mothers in question were sentenced to prison sentences in Siberia, the young children would accompany them. Crime committed by children and youths also rose sharply. The growing desperation and frustration of the public unloaded itself in a rise in crime, especially by women and children.

=== History by republic ===
==== Belarus ====
Along with Ukraine, the Byelorussian SSR was one of the regions where the UNRRA was the most active between 1945 and 1947 to combat malnourishment and famine.

==== Moldavia ====
Between 1946 and 1947, the Moldavian SSR suffered 100,000–115,000 recorded deaths linked to starvation, which translates to approximately 5% of the population. Incidents of cannibalism were recorded. Moldavia was one of the areas most affected by the famine, especially in the harvest-failure regions. The local organizations of the Red Cross in Moldavia invested considerable efforts in feeding hungry civilians, with a particular focus on orphan children. The Moldavian Red Cross established 550 feeding points (питатель’ные пункты), and an additional 222 barracks for people with dystrophy. Furthermore, there were another 200 feeding stations and 180 barracks administered by organizations other than the Red Cross. While some of these institutions were of considerable effectiveness, some emergency responses, like those organized by Moldavian SSR Minister of Health M. Sukharev in April 1947, when the famine deaths were already in full swing.

==== Russia ====
The Russian SFSR was affected by the famine in several regions, especially the southwest.

==== Ukraine ====
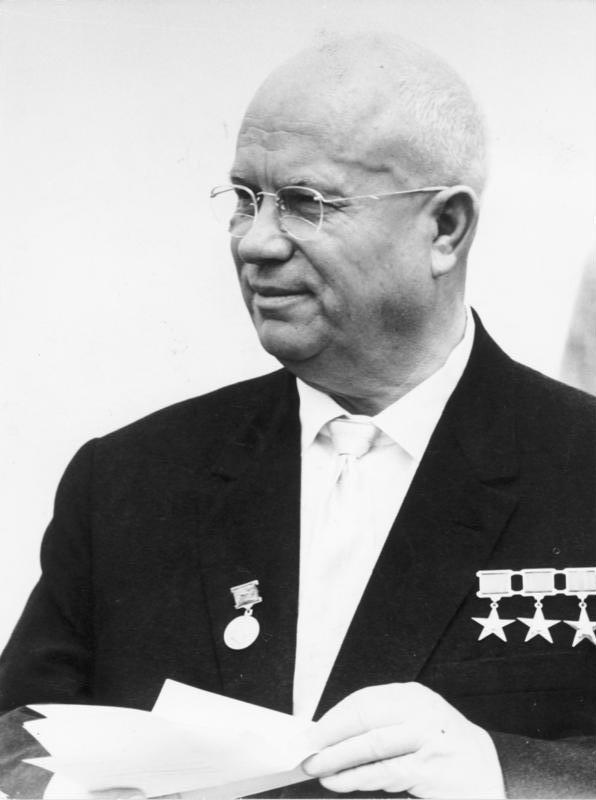
Nikita Khrushchev was active in the Ukrainian SSR during the famine of 1946–1947. He became Leader of the Soviet Union in 1956.

The Ukrainian SSR was one of the areas most affected by the famine, especially in the harvest-failure regions. Harshly treated by the previous Holodomor of 1932–1933, in which economic collectivization had caused crushing agricultural shortages and starvation, it was Western Ukraine, only annexed from the Second Polish Republic in 1939, whose less collectivized agriculture provided relief to the rest of Soviet Ukraine. In a few days in October 1947 alone, some 76,192 Ukrainians were deported into the Gulag system on the backdrop of growing dissent regarding the famine. Along with Belarus, Ukraine was one of the regions where the UNRRA was the most active between 1945 and 1947 to combat malnourishment and famine. The 1946–1947 famine in the Ukrainian SSR was a staging ground for the career of Nikita Khrushchev, who was First Secretary of the Communist Party of Ukraine between 1938 and 1947. However, Khrushchev's political standing was damaged by the famine, and in February 1947, Stalin suggested that Lazar Kaganovich be sent to Ukraine to "help" Khrushchev. The following month, the Ukrainian Central Committee removed Khrushchev as party leader in favor of Kaganovich, while retaining him as premier.

=== International reactions ===
The Soviet government's policy of international secrecy regarding domestic politics meant that the outside world was, especially initially, left in the dark about the exact scale of food shortage in the Soviet Union. The Soviet government actively tried to obscure the scale and severity of the famine.

On 20 July 1946, the International Emergency Food Council (IEFC) was founded under the aegis of the UN Food and Agriculture Organization (FAO), and took over the role of international food relief. The Soviet Union declined participation in this organization, as it would have required disclosure of several critical economic statistics, and as a result lost access to a valuable possible avenue of foreign aid.

==== United States ====
The famine came at a time when the relationship between the United States and the Soviet Union was rapidly deteriorating after the Grand Alliance and leading into the Cold War. The U.S. has assisted the Soviet Union using organizations such as the Russian War Relief (RWR ("Russian Relief"), headed by Edward Clark Carter), organized in 1941, in its war efforts against Germany. Prominent Americans such as Helen Hayes and Katharine Hepburn volunteered to work for the organization to raise funds for the Soviet war effort. The U.S. government also channeled civilian relief assistance to the USSR through the United Nations Relief and Rehabilitation Administration (UNRRA), established in 1943, and shipped military support in form of the Lend-Lease deliveries. American assistance added 5% to Soviet resources in 1942, and 10% in 1943 and 1944.

Previously, the United States had also sent aid to Russia during the famine of 1921–1922 in form of the ARA.

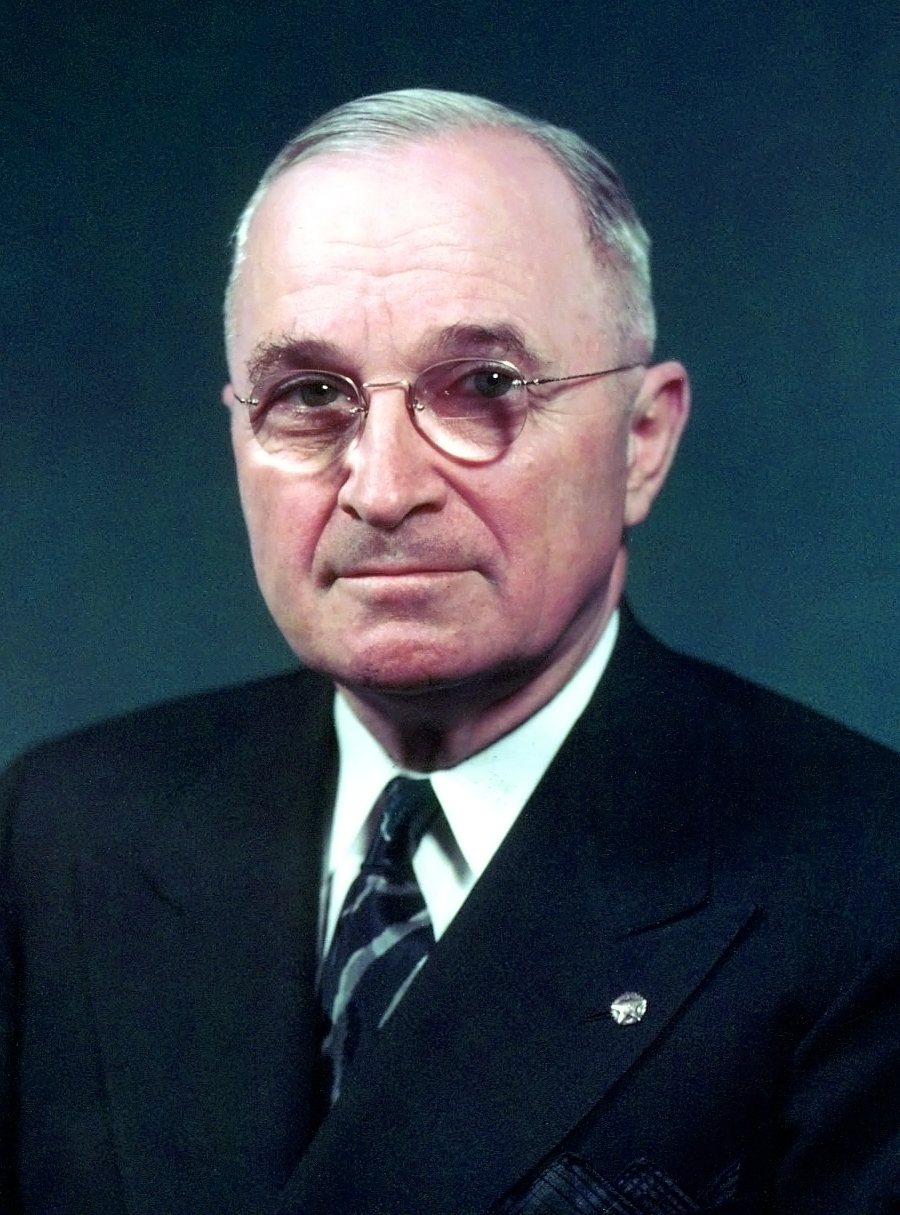
Harry S. Truman

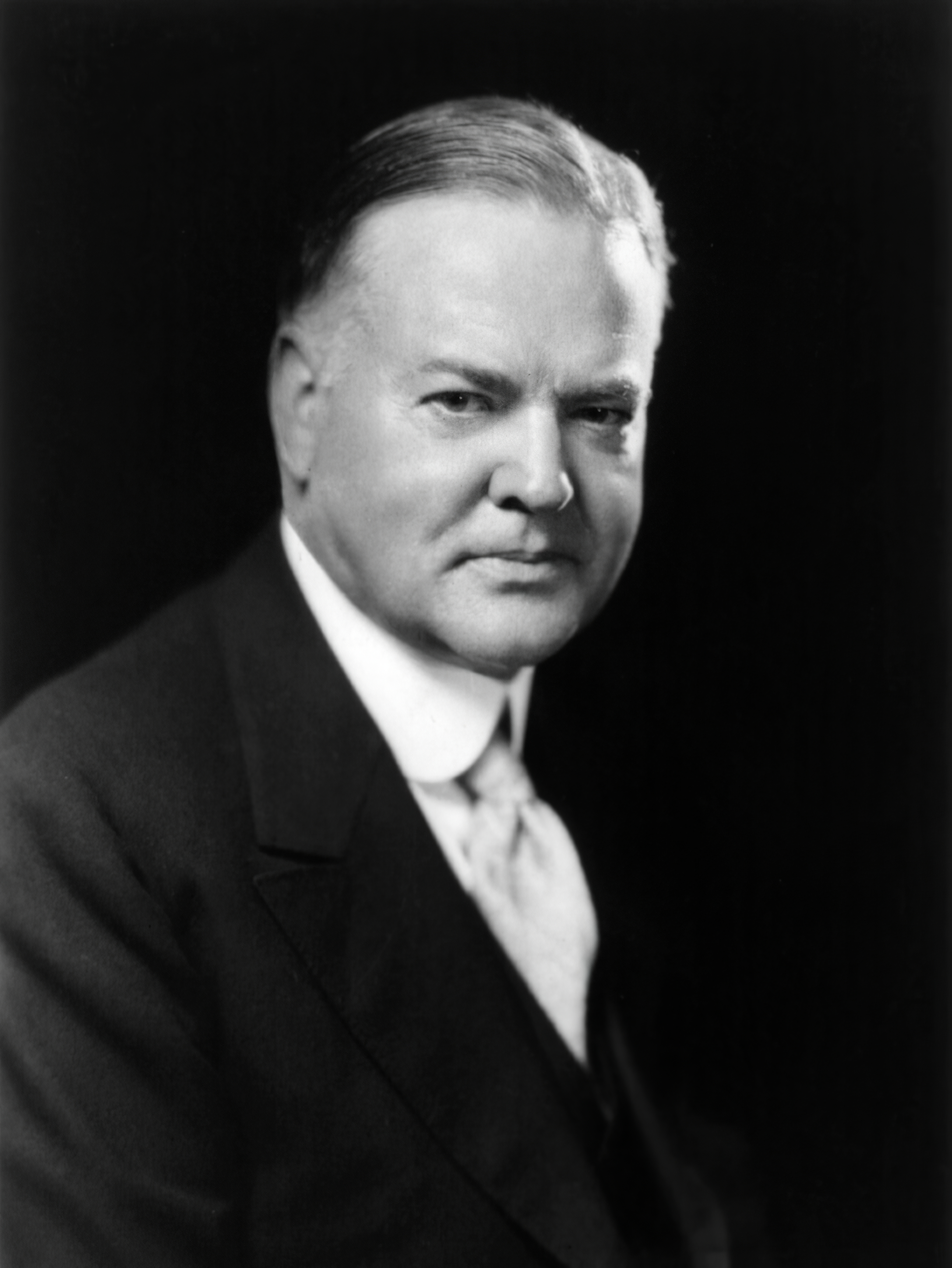
Herbert Hoover

In regards to American action during the Soviet famine of 1946–1947, a peculiar role is taken by U.S. President Harry S. Truman, who likely chose passivity over assertive offers of famine relief to allow the Soviet Union to damage itself on the backdrop of the upcoming Cold War.

While we could classify the Soviet satellite states, we could not classify Russia proper, for that country gave out no information. However, we knew what the Russian ration was in most cities and that the Russians had seized huge amounts of food in their invasion of Eastern Europe, Mongolia, and Manchuria. We believed that Russia proper was in no critical need, and even hoped that, in view of the gigantic amounts they had plundered, they might help out with some supplies for the hungry.

— Herbert Hoover, [Ganson 2009: p. xiv]

On 1 March 1946, the Truman Administration established the Famine Emergency Committee (FEC) with Herbert Hoover, former U.S. president and former head of the ARA, at the helm. Hoover later remarked that the FEC did not provide assistance to the USSR as it had been assumed that not only would the Soviet Union have enough food for its own population, but that it would also assist in the food relief for other regions. The Americans had been interested in providing assistance to other countries for American diplomatic gain, but unlike in 1921–1922, the USSR remained outside that scope.

Truman had been briefed on the disastrous situation in Russia at the latest on 16 December 1946, and assumed that Soviet requests for American assistance were imminent. Furthermore, Truman actively encouraged the Soviet Union to continue and even increase its grain exports over the course of the years 1945 and 1946, without clarifying to the Soviets how keenly aware he and the U.S. administration were in regards to the agricultural shortages in the Soviet Union that had persisted since World War II. The Americans wanted to use the growing Cold War rivalry and Moscow's self-consciousness about Soviet global prestige to lessen the strain placed on the United States by UNRRA contributions, to which the U.S. was the main contributor.

Truman, on request of the Combined Food Board, sent a letter to Stalin on 6 May 1946 to request Soviet contributions to UNRRA to be increased. Stalin rejected this on 16 May 1946.

Individual Americans, such as Fiorello La Guardia, were active proponents of U.S. assistance to the Soviet Union, but the Soviets failed to follow such an avenue of foreign aid. When La Guardia met with Stalin on 29 August 1946 to discuss the situation in the USSR, Stalin went against the expectation that he might overexaggerate the scale of crisis, and instead strongly underplayed the severity of hunger and famine in the Soviet Union.

The Truman administration worked towards its own economic interest to shut down UNRRA, in spite of the fact that American leadership was aware how desperately needed UNRRA relief work was in the Soviet Union. The Americans succeeded in this objective by early 1947, when UNRRA was largely shut down.

The fact that the Soviet Union publicly obscured its domestic famine, and thus its comparative international weakness, allowed the Truman administration to point to the USSR as an imminent and serious military threat. The Americans, well aware of how paralyzed the Soviets were by their domestic agricultural troubles (the U.S. Joint Intelligence Staff concluded in November 1945 that the Soviet Union was so weakened by war that the USSR would not be ready for another major war for at least 15 years), nonetheless allowed the Soviet Union to maintain the farce of outward-facing strength to facilitate the Americans' own agenda domestically and internationally. The Truman administration found the spectre of a growing Soviet military threat desirable, as it allowed the American government to ramp up domestic and international support for the Truman Doctrine (1947), the Marshall Plan (1948), and the formation of NATO (1949).

== Timeline ==
- 1891 to 1892: Russian famine of 1891–1892.
- 1917: Russian Revolution.
- 1917 to 1922: Russian Civil War.
- 1921 to 1922: Russian famine of 1921–1922.
- 1932 to 1933: Soviet famine of 1932–1933 (in Ukraine: "Holodomor").
- 22 June 1941: Operation Barbarossa, entry of the Soviet Union into World War II.
- 1943: Establishment of the United Nations Relief and Rehabilitation Administration (UNRRA).
- 8 May 1945: Germany surrenders, ending World War II in Europe.
- 2 September 1945: Japan surrenders, ending World War II.
- 1945 to 1946: Food shortages in the Soviet Union persist. Government efforts to increase the accessibility of food are only partially effective.
- 1946: The drought of 1946 ravages the year's harvest. Harvests decline by 20% from 1945, putting them around 60% the levels of 1940.
- February 1946: The Soviet government drastically lowers food prices in an effort to make food more accessible and to discourage black market activity. The lowered prices result in a drastic reduction of quality of the available bread ("hidden inflation").
- 1 March 1946: The U.S. government of Harry S. Truman establishes the Famine Emergency Committee (FEC) under the leadership of Herbert Hoover, resulting in coordinated famine relief efforts for several European countries, but not the Soviet Union, partially due to Soviet government secrecy about the food shortages in the USSR.
- May 1946: The Soviet government issues the state reconstruction and development bond, at an initial value of 20 billion rubles.
- 20 July 1946: The International Emergency Food Council (IEFC) is formed by the United Nations Food and Agriculture Organization (FAO). The Soviet Union, fearing loss of national sovereignty due to the statistical data required by the FAO to be provided by members, declines membership.
- 29 August 1946: In a meeting with UNRRA head Fiorello La Guardia, Joseph Stalin fails to disclose the level of severity of the food shortages in the USSR, and again misses an opportunity to request international assistance.
- September 1946: Launch of the "Campaign to Economize on Bread", making bread significantly more expensive. While some wage increases are passed to go along with this price hike, wages are not raised by the same levels that prices are.
- 1 October 1946: The government decree "On Economizing in the Consumption of Grain" comes into force, drastically reducing the number of citizens eligible to receive ration cards.
- October 1946: The planned amount of bread is scaled back by the Soviet government by tens of thousands of tons.
- 1 November 1946: Combined proportion of oats, barley, and maize in bread raised to 40% (25% in Moscow and Leningrad), further reducing the quality of the bread.
- December 1946: Famine begins to appear on a massive scale in the state farm sector. Rapid growth of starvation deaths in the USSR.
- 16 December 1946: Harry S. Truman is clearly informed about the ongoing famine in the Soviet Union, but decides to not take a proactive stance in offering assistance to the Soviet Union.
- March 1947: First peak of famine deaths.
- May to June 1947: Second peak of famine deaths.
- July 1947: Rumors of a renewed price hike cause a run on the banks and stores in the Soviet Union.
- December 1947: Monetary reform in the Soviet Union, 1947.
- 20 October 1948: Adoption of the Great Plan for the Transformation of Nature by the Soviet government.

== Cultural legacy ==
Within the context of Soviet famines, the 1946–1947 famine is often overshadowed by the amount of attention given to the 1932–1933 famine.

=== Moldova ===
Moldova (known as the Moldavian SSR at the time) was perhaps the only part of the Soviet Union that was more affected by the 1946–1947 famine than it was by either the 1921–1922 or the 1932–1933 famines, as modern Moldova was annexed by the USSR as recently as 1940. The 1946–1947 famine has thus spawned a considerable amount of academic work done specifically on the Moldavian SSR during the time. Among the most notable scholars of the Moldavian famine is Igor Cașu of Moldova State University in Chișinău.

=== Ukraine ===
The Soviet famines (particularly the Soviet famine of 1932–1933, the local Ukrainian variant being known as "Holodomor") resulted in lasting and severe cultural and demographic damages in Ukraine, with accusations of genocide by the Soviet government gaining traction after national independence. According to Raphael Lemkin, the 1946–1947 famine belongs into a bigger picture of a "long genocide" against the Ukrainian people that lasted from 1920 to 1947. Ukraine suffered perhaps as many as 15 million excess deaths between 1914 and 1948, and especially the 1930s and the 1940s were a traumatic time, when the hunger and starvation of the Holodomor was followed by the Great Purge and by World War II, which then in turn led back to hunger in form of the 1946–1947 famine.

While the 1946–1947 famine is often overshadowed in Ukrainian conversations by its deadlier 1932–1933 counterpart, it remains part of the conversation about the Soviet legacy in Ukraine. The People's Movement of Ukraine ("Rukh") was formed in 1990, shortly before the dissolution of the Soviet Union, to resolve the popular resentment at the Soviet famines, including the 1946–1947 famine. Before 2014 (the year of the Euromaidan and the annexation of Crimea by the Russian Federation) the Ukrainian government's willingness to aggressively pursue a specific role of tragedy and suffering for the Ukrainian people during the Soviet famines had varied with changing governments in Kyiv.

== Bibliography ==
Often overshadowed by its 1932–1933 counterpart, it took until the 1990s for the 1946–1947 famine to become a field of study in its own right.

=== Venjamin F. Zima (1996): Famine in the USSR 1946–1947: Origins and Consequences ===
[T]he Soviet government cited drought, the dangers of aggression from former allies to carry out a famine with the aim of preserving grain reserves and selling grain abroad. Apart from this the famine was used to teach and urge on the labour active on the collective and state farms forcing them to work for a bowl of soup on the fields.

— Venjamin F. Zima (1996), [Wheatcroft 2012: p. 989]

Venjamin F. Zima published (in Russian) what is, according to Elena Zubkova and Nicholas Ganson, the first full-length monograph about the famine in 1996, titled Golod v SSSR 1946–1947 godov: proiskhozhdeniie i posledstviia (Famine in the USSR 1946–1947: Origins and Consequences). Zima had previously published articles about the famine in the early 1990s. Drawing parallels between the famine and other political proceedings of the late Stalin era (like the Doctors' plot or the Leningrad affair), in which the Stalin government attempted to reassert sociopolitical control over Soviet society after the loss of political control during the chaotic war years, Zima posits that the 1946–1947 famine was an intentional punitive, a premeditated famine, aimed at the Soviet peasantry.

The available data on grain production, collection and stocks do not support Zima’s contention that huge amounts of grain were available, which could easily have been used by Stalin to avoid the strain on the peasantry. No such stocks existed, and in the circumstances of the World Food Crisis of 1946–1947 there would have been great difficulties in importing any amount of grain in these years.

— Stephen G. Wheatcroft, [Wheatcroft 2012: p. 1004]

The viewpoint of the premeditated famine has been criticized by subsequent historians, but Zima's importance to the historiography of the famine is acknowledged by the critics. Zima's approach was criticized by Nicholas Ganson for being overly focussed on Soviet domestic political history, and putting too little weight on the historical context of World War II. Stephen G. Wheatcroft agrees with Zima's outline of the three principal factors from which famine resulted (post-war difficulties, the drought of 1946, food requisitioning), but criticizes Zima's simplification of those factors, as well as Zima's uncritical usage of official Soviet government statistics. Wheatcroft especially takes issue with Zima's claim that the government had large grain reserves that the Stalin administration maliciously chose to withhold.

=== Michael Ellmann (2000): The 1947 Soviet Famine and the Entitlement Approach to Famines ===
During the famine, surplus stocks in the hands of the state seem to have been sufficient to have fed all those who died of starvation. The famine was a FAD₂ (preventable food availability decline) famine, which occurred because a drought caused a bad harvest and hence reduced food availability, but, had the priorities of the government been different, there might have been no famine (or a much smaller one) despite the drought.

— Michael Ellman (2000), [Ellman 2000: p. 603]

Michael Ellman wrote an article, titled "The 1947 Soviet Famine and the Entitlement Approach to Famines", in the Cambridge Journal of Economics in 2000. In it, Ellman uses the "entitlement approach" in explaining the economics of famines, as developed by Amartya K. Sen in 1977 case study of the 1943 Bengal Famine and in subsequent works. Using Sen's model, Ellman reaches the conclusion that the 1946–1947 qualifies as a FAD₂ (preventable food availability decline) famine, in which a great of deaths could have been prevented if government-controlled food supplies had been more accessible to the civilian population.

Ellman's work has been criticized by Stephen G. Wheatcroft for its uncritical acceptance of the grain stock numbers laid out by Zima in 1996. Wheatcroft argues that Ellman is broadly including food in state possession that was already marked up for other purposes in the assessment, and that this is inaccurate.

=== Nicholas Ganson (2009): The Soviet Famine of 1946–1947 in Global and Historical Perspective ===
Nicholas Ganson published a 218-page study of the famine in 2009, titled The Soviet Famine of 1946–1947 in Global and Historical Perspective. Ganson's book has become a standard work on the 1946–1947 famine.

Using a comparative focus in the context of global history and ideology, Ganson evaluates the findings of previous historians, and finds disagreements especially with Zima's conclusion regarding a premeditated famine. He points to Soviet relief efforts as an indicator that the Soviet government was indeed not bringing about a famine by choice, and strikes a more balanced explanation than that of Zima, pointing to a mixture of weather effects, war damages and Soviet government incompetence and ideological intransigence (especially in favoring industry over agriculture and in refusing to request foreign aid). Ganson also lays significant criticism at the feet of Harry S. Truman, whose American administration Ganson interprets as having deliberately abstained from offering assistance.

From the perspective of the Soviet state, the mass mortality precipitated by its policies in 1946–1947 was in a very direct sense collateral damage. The extreme measures taken in September 1946 resulted from Stalin's late recognition of the developing grain crisis. Widespread death and want [...] were undesirable: they made people lose faith in communism, hindered labor output, and undermined the Soviet leadership in the eyes of the people. [...] With the help of society, members of the Soviet Red Cross and Ministry of Health made efforts to provide relief to the needy. But for those in the upper echelons of Soviet power, the goals of preserving and later building up grain stocks dwarfed the value of human life.

— Nicholas Ganson (2009), [Ganson 2009: p. 149]

Ganson ultimately concludes that the victims of the 1946–1947 famine were not victims of a premeditated famine as posited by Zima, but that were nonetheless the "collateral damage" that resulted from Soviet government policy and ideological dogmatism. Ganson puts particular focus on the power struggle between the Soviet Union and the United States in the emerging Cold War, and points to the Soviet government's unwillingness to appear weak compared to the United States as one of the main reasons for the Soviet government's ineffective response to the famine.

The book was acknowledged by Stephen G. Wheatcroft as an important work, and has been positively reviewed by J. Eric Duskin, who called the work "important and provocative", and Alexis Peri, who called it "lucidly written" and who elevated as main strengths of the books its intricately detailed analysis of domestic and global political contexts as well as larger Russian history, but who also noted Ganson's overreliance on sources affiliated with the CPSU and his failure to portray the suffering of Soviet peasants as vividly as the conflict between Truman and Stalin.

=== Other works ===
Igor Cașu wrote a chapter about the famine's effects in the Moldavian SSR in a 2014 publication about Soviet governmental repression in the area.

Donald Filtzer wrote about the famine in his 2002 book Soviet Workers and Late Stalinism: Labour and Restoration of the Stalinist System After World War 2, as well as a chapter he contributed to the 2008 collective work A Dream Deferred: New Studies in Russian and Soviet Labour History, titled "The 1947 Food Crisis and Its Aftermath: Worker and Peasant Consumption in Non-Famine Regions of the RSFSR".

Ivan Mefodievich Volkov wrote a Russian-language article about the 1946–1947 drought and famine in 1992. It was republished in English in 2014.

Stephen G. Wheatcroft wrote an article, partially in response to the premeditated famine thesis by Zima (as well as the works by Ellman, Filtzer, and Zubkova that are based on Zima's numbers), about the 1946–1947 famine. Published in 2012.

Elena Zubkova wrote about the 1946–1947 famine in her Russia after the War: Hopes, Illusions, and Disappointments, 1945–1957, published in 1998.

== See also ==
- Russian famine of 1921–1922
- 1921–1922 famine in Tatarstan
- Soviet famine of 1932–1933
- Holodomor
- Droughts and famines in Russia and the Soviet Union
- Great Leap Forward
- Great Chinese Famine
- North Korean famine
- List of famines
