= Monetary reform in the Soviet Union, 1922–24 =

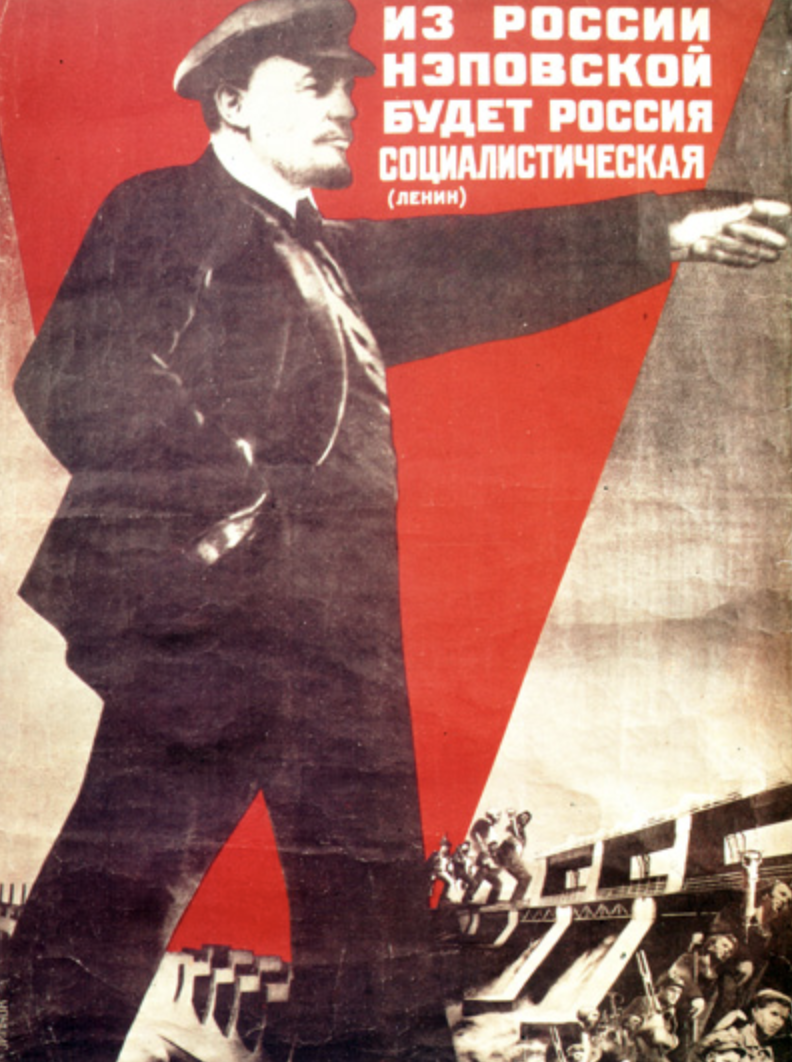
- New Economic Policy propaganda poster
- Location: Soviet Union
- Type: Monetary policy
- Cause: Russian Revolution; Russian Civil War; World War I
- Organized by: Premier Vladimir Lenin
- Outcome: Return to the gold standard; End of Soviet hyperinflation; Stabilization of the Soviet economy

The 1922–1924 monetary reform of the Soviet Union was a set of monetary policies which was implemented in the Soviet Union as a part of the Soviet government’s New Economic Policy. The principal objectives of the reform included stopping the effects of hyperinflation, establishing a unified medium of exchange and the creation of a more-independent central bank.

According to economic data recorded in the archives of the Soviet Union and the Russian Federation, results of the reform were mixed; some modern-day economists call the new policies a successful transition towards state capitalism, but others describe them as problematic and failing to uphold the targets laid out in its original blueprint. Economists such as John Maynard Keynes categorize the reform as an aggregation of short-term monetary expansion experiments which defined Soviet monetary and fiscal policies, where the state played an active role in dictating economic growth.

== Purpose ==
According to historian Gustavus Tuckerman and economist Yasushi Nakamura, the reform's central theme was stabilisation. A united pursuit of the goal of stabilisation by the Soviet Politburo and the Central Planning Committee gave rise to a series of monetary experiments which, to a great extent, contradicted the collective ownership which was a core principle of The Communist Manifesto and the Soviet planned economy. Nakamura catalogues a list of government agencies which independently proposed a collection of monetary policies to the central government for incorporation into the reform.

== Introduction of the reforms (July 1922) ==
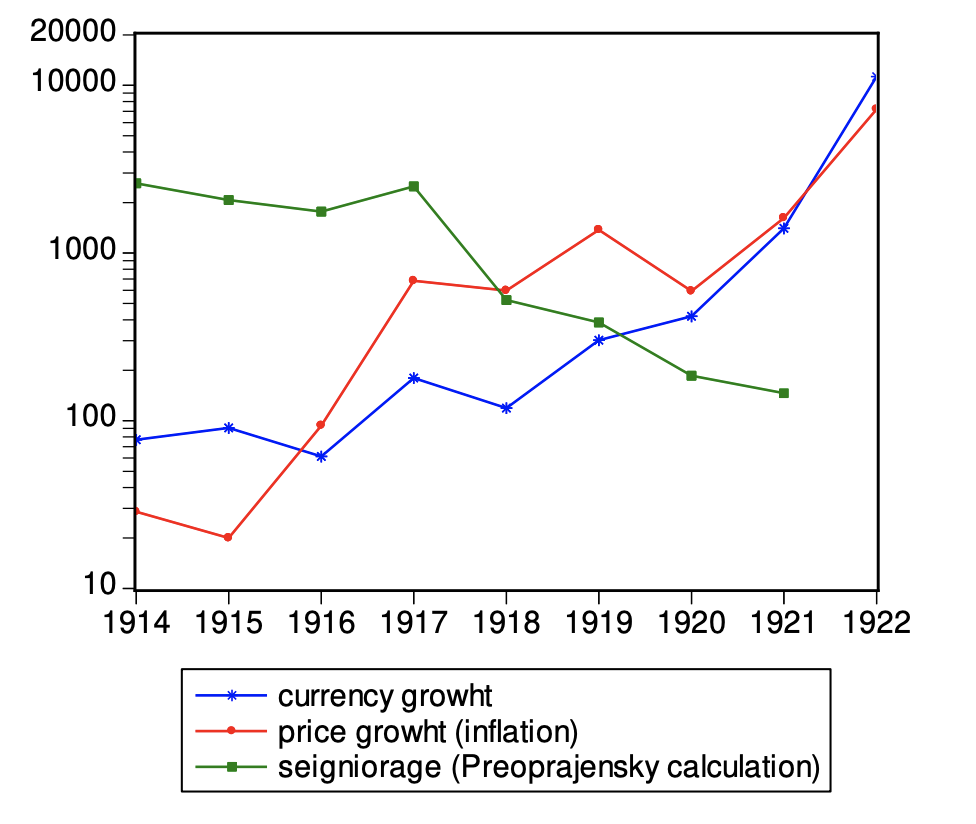
Annual growth of the Russian monetary supply, prices and seigniorage, 1914–1922, calculated by E. Preobrazhenski

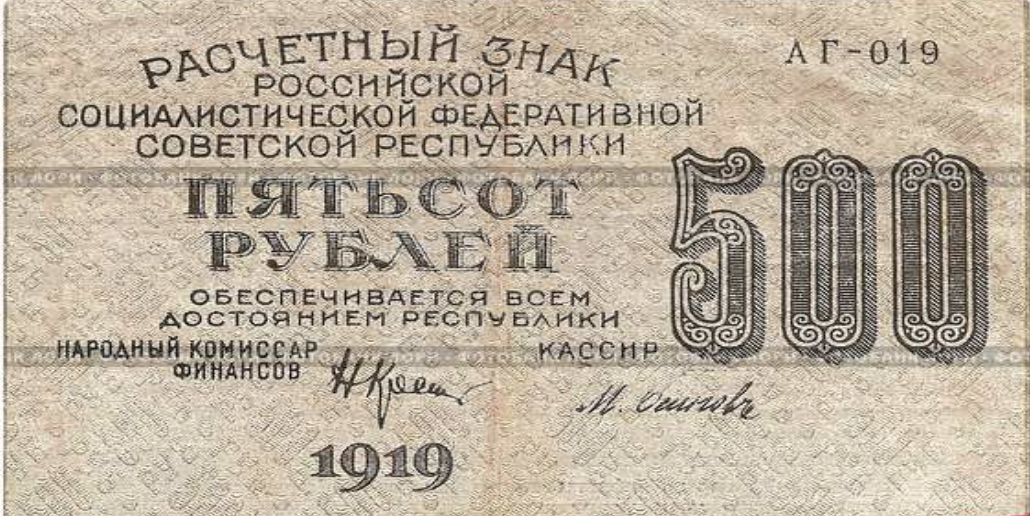
1919 500-rouble sovznak (promissory note)

With a budget deficit since the start of World War I, the Russian economy was in recession and near collapse by the end of the Russian Civil War (1918–1921). According to historian Paul Flewers, economic war communism and ideological questioning of the long-term need for a monetary system triggered a massive increase in the money supply; this prolonged a continued rise in the Soviet Union's domestic inflation rate. The Soviet economic data archive indicates that by 1921, the national monthly inflation rate averaged about 50 per cent and the quantity of currency in the Soviet economy increased by 164.2 times. According to the Soviet Union's 1921 purchasing-power index, 10,000 Soviet sovznaks had the purchasing power of 0.59 1914 chervonets.

=== Beginning ===
Soviet monetary reform began in July 1922 when Gosbank (the Soviet central bank) was given a degree of autonomy by Gosplan, the State Planning Committee. According to Russian historian Zahari Atlas, the bank was given the right to issue national banknotes and the power to restrict government access to capital. A more-independent central bank became an economic oversight mechanism to fight inflation and gave the Soviet economy the flexibility to counter domestic and global fluctuations. Economist Amy Hewes wrote that the policy outcomes were the Soviet economy's return to the gold standard, the introduction of a separate national currency, elimination of the government’s budget deficit and the restoration of a centrally-administered tax system. By the end of 1922, a dual-currency system was in place; gold-pegged Russian chervonets were restored as a unit of account, and Soviet printed money (sovznaks) was commissioned as the nationalised medium of exchange and domestic means of payment.

== Implementation of the reform (1922–1923) ==
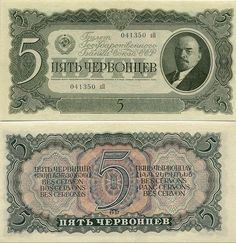
Both sides of a 1923 five-chervonets note

S. S. Katzenellenbaum’s data indicates how the first round of policies surrounding the creation of a more-independent central bank lowered the Soviet government’s fiscal expenditure relative to the nation’s currency circulation from 85 per cent in 1920 to 26.6 per cent by June 1923. Although the nationalised market traded with the gold-backed chervonets, private markets operated with the more liquid, government-monitored sovznak. Since the chervonets and sovznak were convertible and foreign trade institutions only accepted the chervonets as a means of payment, the dual-currency system became a transaction channel connecting the sovznak- oriented Soviet economy with the gold-pegged international monetary system. According to historian-economist Alexander Gourvitch's analysis, the Soviet dual-currency system was a direct monetary-transaction channel in the Soviet economy (reopened to international exports and imports); this resulted in a steadily-increasing trade surplus and the rapid stabilisation of domestic commodity prices. Liberal Keynesians (including Keynes himself) praised Soviet monetary reform as "pioneering the foundation of a more progressive monetary system that effectively incorporates the power of state-led fiscal policies without harming the fundamental flexibility required for a functioning market economy." In contrast, most contemporary Western economists maintained that any degree of state intervention would make it impossible to maintain long-term growth and the Soviet planned economy was unsustainable.

== Dual-currency system ==
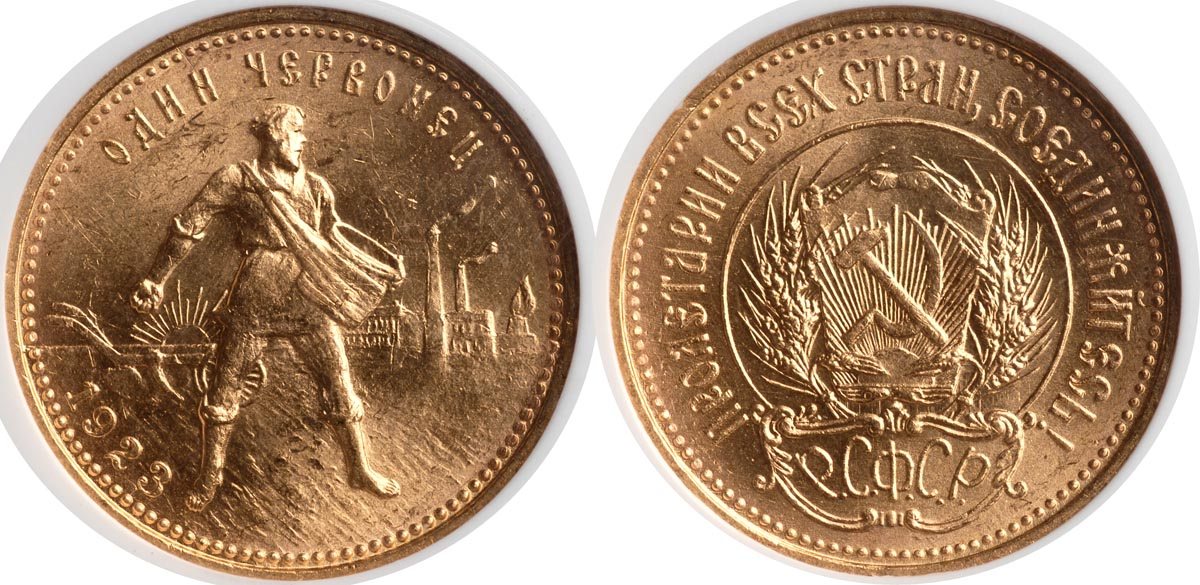
1923 chervonets coin

According to the monetary-policy proposals enumerated by Nikolay Nenovsky, Gosbank proposed to issue banknotes based on short-term obligations backed by gold; Gosplan advocated eliminating the gold standard and encouraged transitioning to a commodity-oriented monetary system. More-liberal government agencies, such as the Ministry of Trade, advocated policies such as the acceptance of loans from foreign banking institutions and temporary integration into a collection of international monetary systems controlled by foreign central banks. According to Nenovsky, which policies could be integrated was debated from July 1921 to November 1922. Although stabilisation remained the core goal, Soviet conservative economists (represented by Gosplan head Stanislav Strumilin) were reluctant to expose too much of the Soviet economy to Western institutions; they called the institutions (which funded the White movement) "capitalist aggressors" who opposed the Soviets. Strumilin remained supportive of a "socialist commodity exchange," which functioned under the rules of modern-day fiat currency-backed monetary systems. Combining all the proposed policies into one, Soviet monetary reform was an aggregation of policies in which foreign long- and short-term loans (backed by a variety of mineral commodities) were accepted; the government-controlled dual-currency system remained in place to protect Soviet fiscal sovereignty.

=== Structure ===
In 1923, a dual-currency system composed of chervonets and sovznaks was established. Based on balance-sheet data recorded in Gosbank's issue department, sovznaks were backed by chervonets and 25 per cent of chervonets were backed by a collection of precious metals with a reserve of stable foreign currencies pegged to the gold standard. The remaining 75 per cent were backed by short-term commodity loans provided by foreign banks. Described by Nenovsky as a "deliberate arrangement" to uphold Soviet fiscal sovereignty, it connected the Soviet economy with Western financial systems; chervonets acted as a buffer, so foreign banks could not directly influence the sovznak-oriented Soviet domestic economy. Under an official exchange rate, chervonets and sovznaks were convertible; according to Nakamura, however, no clear channel of exchange between the currencies was established until 1924. As a result, most Soviet economic activity was conducted in sovznaks.

=== Issues ===
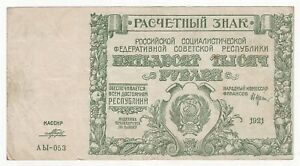
1921 50,000-rouble sovznak

According to Katzenellenbaum’s data, the Soviet trade surplus grew steadily under the dual-currency system and generated the capital reserve needed to repay the short-term foreign loans which backed the chervonets. All primary debt was repaid and the national current account became positive by the end of 1923, indicating that the Soviet Union had control of its monetary system. Keynes noted that since the chervonets and sovznak were now controlled by a single monetary system, a rivalry between them was inevitable. As the Soviet Union's gold-pegged currency, the chervonets had a higher monetary value than the government-priced sovznak.

As Nenovsky described, the chervonets (like other contemporary gold-pegged currencies) adapted to changes in market conditions and had international recognition; the sovznak's value was controlled by the government, limiting its ability to react to market movements. In a note to the central bank, Soviet treasurer Grigori Sokolnikov wrote that the value disparity between the currencies was a growing problem for the domestic economy; the government determined the value of sovznaks against the central bank’s supply of chervontses, but the market preferred the more-valuable legal tender. Since the sovznak's primary purpose was to be a "monetary line of defence" when the chervonets was indirectly controlled by the foreign loans which initially backed 75 per cent of its value, the repayment of these loans by the end of 1923 negated the sovznak's raison d'être. According to the Soviet political archives, the pursuit of a "peaceful coexistence" between the currencies was discontinued at the 12th Congress of Soviets in 1923 and a gradual shift towards a single currency began. Soviet literature started calling the chervonets a "stable currency", and the sovznak was described as "declining". On 7 July 1924, the Politburo decided to limit the issue of sovznaks and begin a controlled elimination of the dual-currency system.

== Single-currency system (1923–1924) ==
=== Price scissors ===
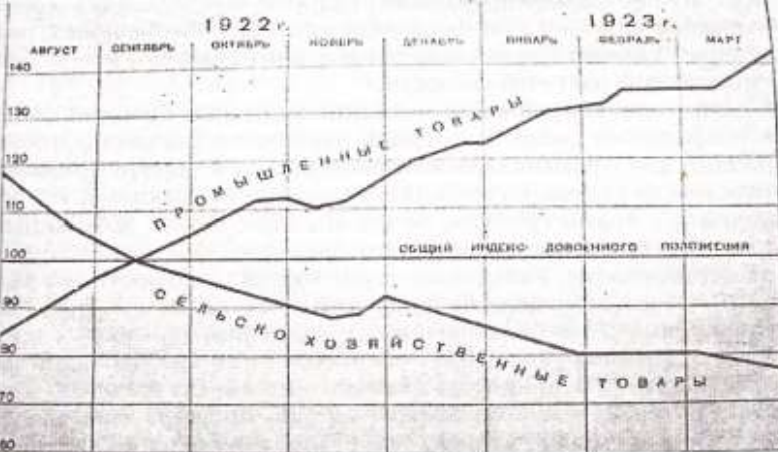
1922–23 price scissors

With the Soviet government favouring the chervonets and its economy geared toward the sovznak, the Scissors Crisis had happened during 1922–1923. According to Katzenellenbaum's data, high industrial prices and low agricultural prices led to an excessive transfer of resources from the sovznak-oriented countryside to the chervonets-dominated, urban industrialised centres. This price imbalance accelerated the sovznak's depreciation, and its daily inflation rate was as high as 4.4 per cent by October 1923.

=== Return to a single currency ===
Although the sovznak-oriented Soviet population found it more difficult to conduct daily transactions, chervonets-dominated government expenditures had no shortage of funds and the national balance sheet remained cash-flow positive; state enterprises had minimal losses or profited. By the end of the 1923 fiscal year, a surplus in the Soviet Union’s current account indicated its successful transition to an export-driven economy. According to Soviet archives, sovznaks were no longer issued after 14 February 1924. With an exchange rate of one gold rouble to 50,000 1923 sovznaks and one gold rouble to 50 billion 1922 sovznaks, all sovznaks in circulation were bought by the government between 7 March and 10 May 1924. The dual-currency system ended, and the monetary reform was complete. The Soviet Union’s currency circulation was optimised and the chervonets (later defined as the rouble) was again pegged to gold, the universal storage of value before the adoption of the Bretton Woods system.

== Influence ==
The reform was one of the first economic initiatives implemented across the Soviet Union, and liberal economists have described it as the first successful example of state capitalism. Austrian-school economists, however, refer to the reform as Russia’s "jagged return" to a market-oriented economy. As the first communist-led economic reform, it demonstrated an ideological shift; the Marxist-Leninist proposal to eliminate money was first replaced with a dual-currency system and then a stable, gold-pegged monetary system. With other components of the New Economic Policy, the Soviet monetary model became a widely-adopted exemplar for the late 20th-century economic reforms in other communist nations, e.g., in China and in Vietnam.

== See also ==
- Hyperinflation in early Soviet Russia
- Monetary reform in the Soviet Union, 1947
- Monetary reform in the Soviet Union, 1961
- Pavlov Reform, 1991
- Monetary reform in Russia, 1993
- Monetary reform in Russia, 1998
