= 1993 Russian monetary reform =

Movement to amend the financial system

Russia's monetary reform of 1993 took place from 26 July to 7 August 1993.

== Objectives ==
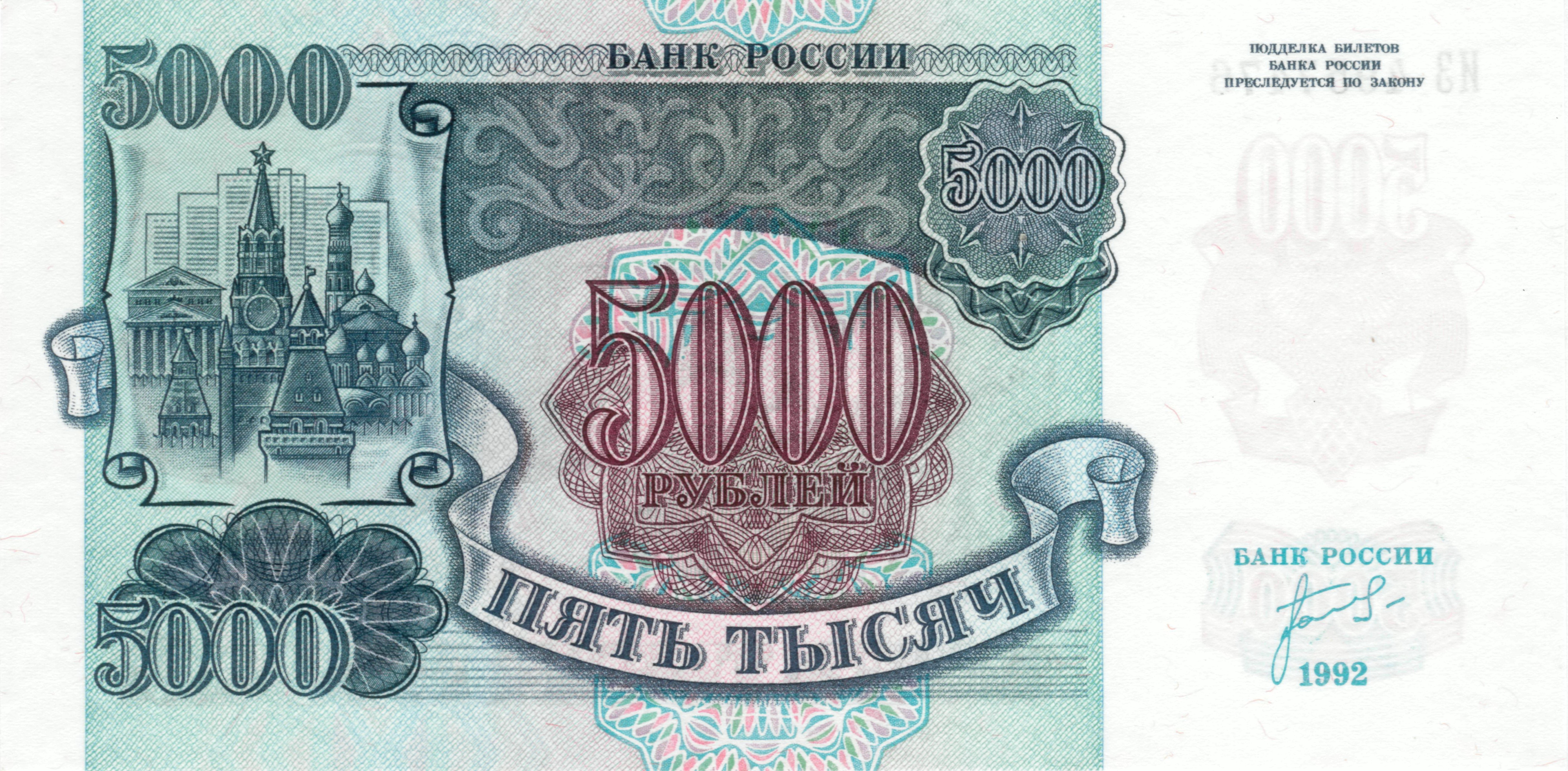
Old series ruble issued in 1992

Russia's 1993 currency reform was intended to tame inflation and exchange the Soviet ruble banknotes remaining in circulation from 1961 to 1992 for Russian banknotes of a new design. The reform was confiscatory, as there were a number of restrictions on the exchange of banknotes. In addition, the reform was carried out during the summer holidays, which created additional problems for citizens. The Central Bank of the Russian Federation issued a clarification that the exchange of banknotes after 1 October 1993 would be made exclusively on presentation of documents that proved the impossibility of exchange in a timely manner.

That restriction was also aimed at combating the influx of currency notes from the former Soviet republics, as the central banks of the Republics ceased to look to Russia's State Bank and started printing their own money. In 1993, the central banks of the former member states began issue of their national currencies to replace the former Soviet ruble, which was a threat to Russia since the old rubles could be sent to Russia and would destabilise its financial system.

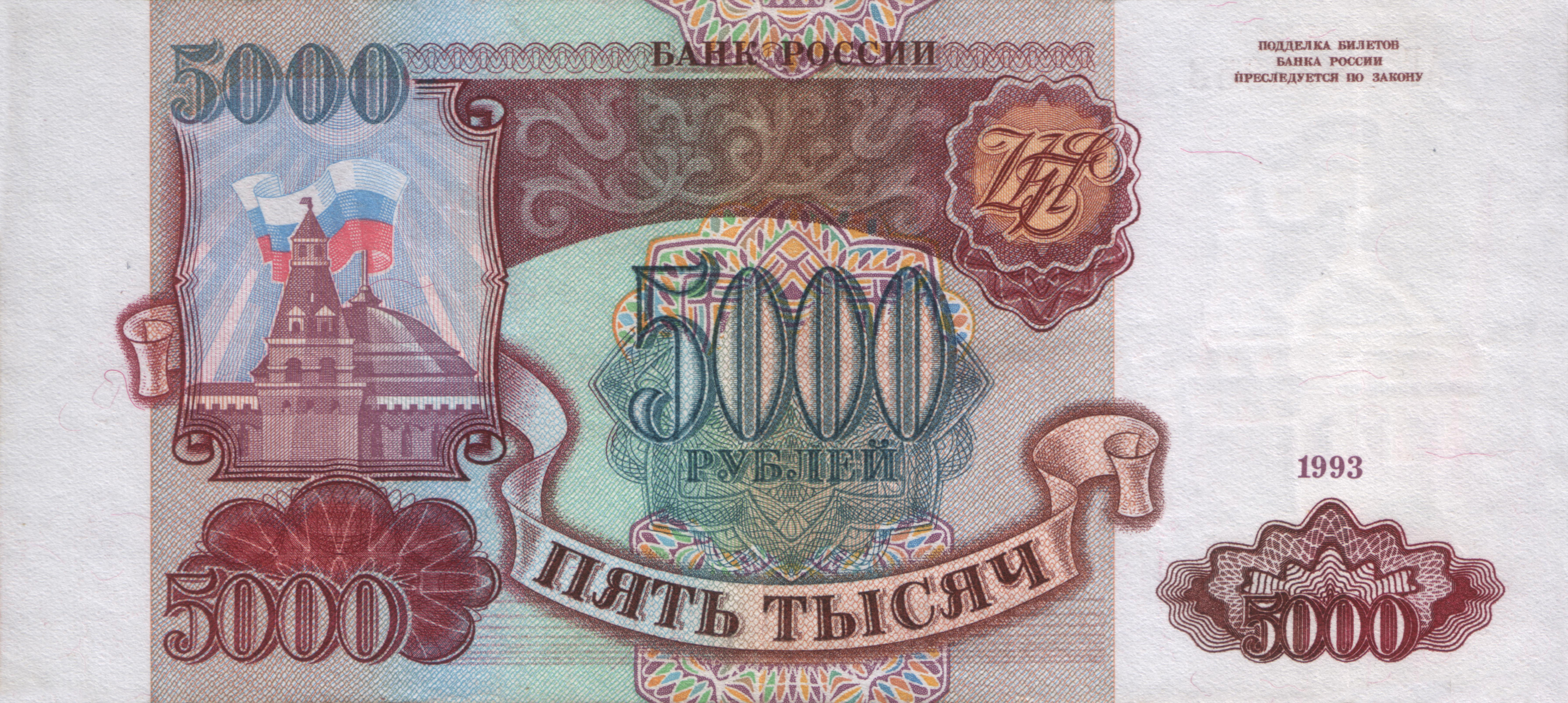
New series ruble issued in 1993

The official aims of the reform were the fight against inflation, the retirement of the old treasury bills of the State Bank of the USSR and the separation of the monetary systems of Russia and the other Commonwealth of Independent States countries. The ruble would be a means of payment in only domestic money circulation.

In fact, on 17 July 1993, Russia withdrew from the ruble zone of the CIS, the ruble as a means of payment in the interconnected CIS economy virtually ceased to exist, Viktor Chernomyrdin's Government deprived Russia of its ability to control all the cash and the issue of the economy depended on it republics of the ruble zone. Non-cash rubles in payments between the republics also ceased to exist.

== Terms ==
The terms of monetary reform were set out in a telegram to the Central Bank of the Russian Federation N 131-93 of July 24, 1993, signed by the Chairman of the Bank of Russia, Viktor Gerashchenko:

The Central Bank of the Russian Federation in accordance with the Law of the Russian Federation "On the monetary system of the Russian Federation" and the RSFSR Law "On the Central Bank of the Russian Federation" in order to prevent multiple modifications of the same value of banknotes in circulation and due to the sufficiency of reserves in bank notes and coins of the Bank of Russia of 1993 stops with zero hours (local time) on 26 July 1993 on the treatment of the entire territory of the Russian Federation government treasury bills of the USSR, the USSR State Bank of tickets and bank notes of the Bank of Russia of 1961-1992 years.

Initially, the exchange limit was set at 35,000 non-denominated rubles (at the time, about US$35). The country started to panic. Two days later, President Boris Yeltsin issued a decree where the exchange amount was increased to 100,000 rubles (about US$100) per person, and the deadline was extended until August 1993.

Citizens of Russia (according to registration in the internal passport) could change the amount of 100,000 rubles, as stamped in passports. Rumours of reform went ahead, the authorities denied them and the reform was carried out during the holiday season, when many were away from their place of residence. The limitation was also aimed at combating the influx of currency notes from the former Soviet republics. As a result, many people did not physically have time to exchange their cash savings, and their money was gone.

Enterprises could exchange cash within cash balances at the beginning of the day on July 26 and had to surrender them to the bank for the banking day on July 26. Amount of money handed over was not to exceed the limit set for the box office of the organization, and the amount of sales proceeds received by the cashier at the end of the day on July 25.

== Results ==
The reform did not strengthen the ruble. In fact, it led to serious complications with its neighbours, as their currencies were tied to the ruble. The central bank had to transfer some of the new banknotes to Kazakhstan and Belarus. In the second half of 1993, Russia tried to negotiate with the neighbors on the establishment of a new type of ruble zone, but only Belarus signed an agreement to combine their monetary systems in the future.

== See also ==
- Monetary reform in the Soviet Union, 1922–24
- Monetary reform in the Soviet Union, 1947
- Monetary reform in the Soviet Union, 1961
- Pavlov Reform, 1991
- Monetary reform in Russia, 1998
