= 1998 Russian monetary reform =

1998 Russian currency reform

Russia launched a monetary reform on January 1, 1998. Preparation started in August 1997. Replacement of the old banknotes occurred gradually, until 2002.

== Background ==
Rumours of reform occurred regularly and were repeatedly denied. In June 1996, the head of the Working Center for Economic Reform Minister Sergei Pavlenko announced the imminent redenomination. According to his calculations, it could not be implemented before 1998, "when inflation in the country will be permanently suppressed". However, in September 1996, the chairman of the Central Bank of Russia, Sergei Dubinin, said that monetary reform was premature.

== Reform ==
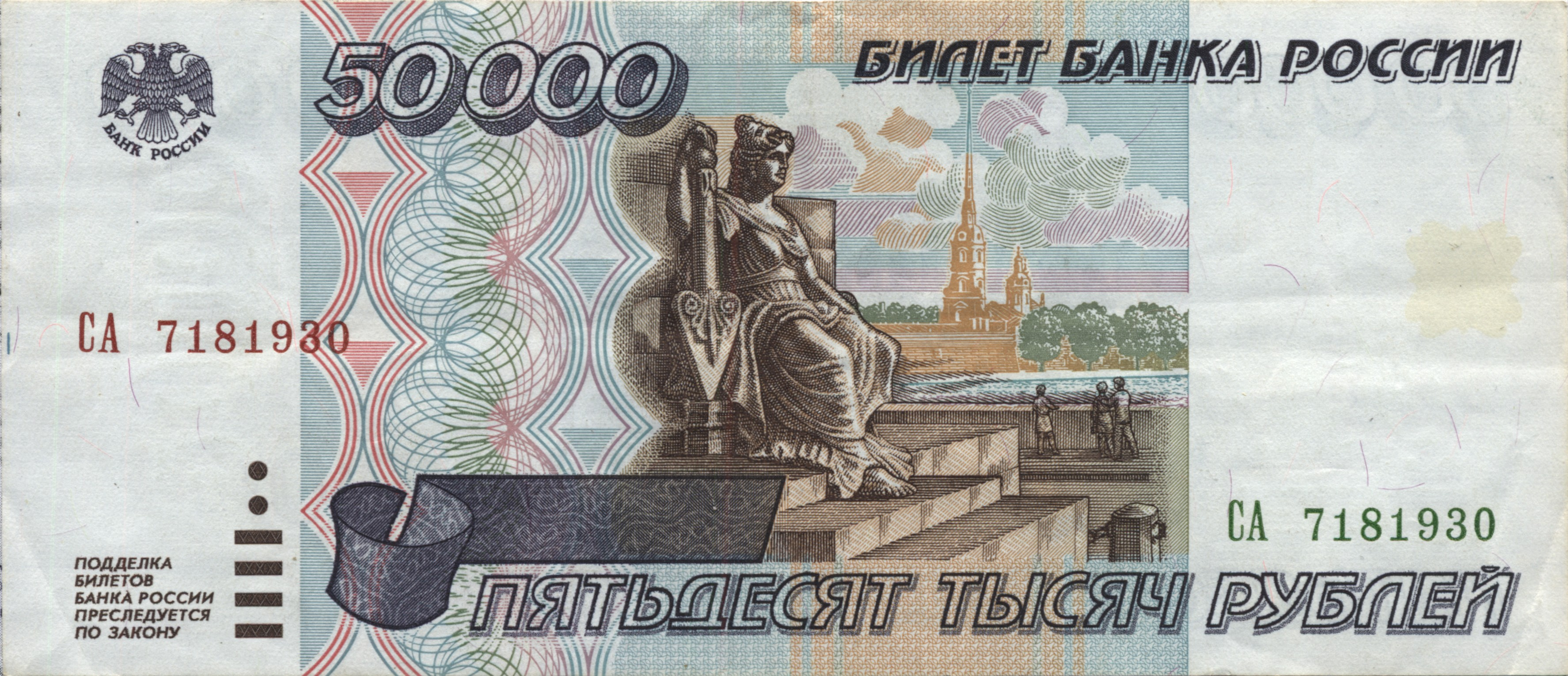
50,000 roubles, pre-reform banknote (issued in 1995)

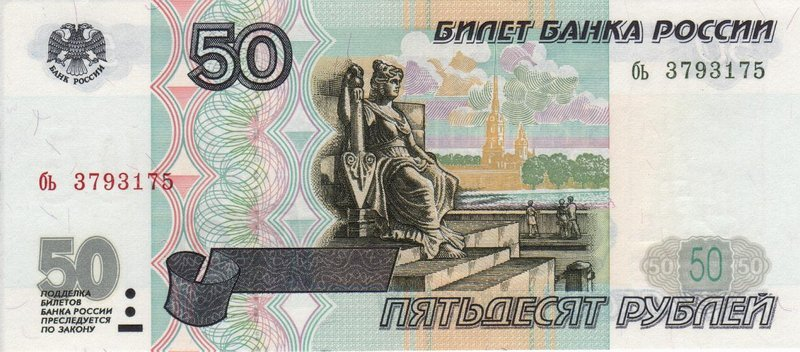
50 roubles redenominated banknote (issued in 1997)

On August 4, 1997, President Boris Yeltsin issued a presidential decree, "On change the face value of a currency and the scale of prices". Exchange began on January 1, 1998, with a new rouble being worth 1000 old roubles (1993 and 1995 series).

Since the Soviet monetary reform in 1991 had left a negative memory by the three-day exchange of 50 and 100-rouble notes, the new exchange was held progressively, until 2002.

All old coins of the Central Bank of Russia (1, 5, 10, 20, 50, 100 roubles and collectible), unlike in the previous two redenominations, ceased to be legal tender. The appearance of the new banknotes after the redenomination did not change; only the face value changed with three zeros removed.

Coins disappeared from circulation as well as the old 1000-rouble banknote, equivalent to the new 1-rouble coin.

Kopeck coins were also introduced, with the image of St. George (1, 5, 10, 50 kopecks), as well as ruble coins, with the image of an eagle (1, 2, 5 roubles).

== Results ==
The monetary reform had a positive impact on the money circulation: it reduced the nominal amount of money catering to payment transactions, it simplified the calculation of the population for goods and services, and accounting operations could be performed with and without cash. There was a return to the familiar monetary system.

== See also ==
- Monetary reform in the Soviet Union, 1922–24
- Monetary reform in the Soviet Union, 1947
- Monetary reform in the Soviet Union, 1961
- Pavlov Reform, 1991
- Monetary reform in Russia, 1993
