= Monetary reform in the Soviet Union, 1961 =

1961 redenomination and devaluation of the ruble

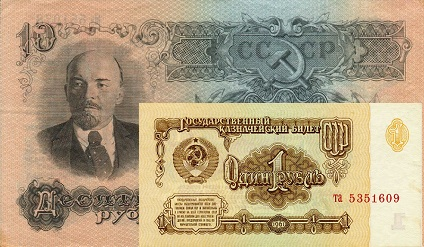
One new ruble of 1961, superimposed on 10 old rubles of 1947.

A monetary reform of the Soviet ruble, also known as the Khrushchev reform (after Nikita Khrushchev, the Soviet leader at the time), took place on 1 January 1961. The reform consisted of the devaluation of the ruble against the United States dollar, and the redenomination of the ruble at a ratio of 10 to 1.

It was the fifth monetary reform in the Soviet Union, succeeding the 1947 reform that occurred in response to the impact of the Second World War.

== Details ==
The first part of the reform was to redenominate the ruble at a ratio of 10 to 1. All prices and salaries would be dealt at one new ruble for every 10 old rubles. Copper coins of 1, 2, 3 and 5 old kopeks were not exchanged: amounts less than one new kopek (or 10 old kopeks) were rounded downwards for essential goods, and upward for the rest.

The second part of the reform was to devalue the ruble against the gold standard, from 14 new rubles per troy ounce to 31.5 new rubles per ounce: by devaluing the official exchange rate of the ruble by 55 5/9%, US$100 bought 90 new rubles instead of 40.

== Later developments ==
The 1961 monetary reform was the last time during the Soviet era in which ruble was redenominated. The next (and most recent) redenomination of the Russian ruble, at a ratio of 1,000 to 1, took place on 1 January 1998 – six years and six days after the dissolution of the Soviet Union (on 26 December 1991).

The 1961 ruble (ISO 4217 code: SUR) became the longest-lasting incarnation of the Soviet ruble, at 37 years and 194 days. However, banknotes of 50 and 100 rubles were demonetised in another monetary reform in 1991; the last banknotes of the 1961 ruble were later demonetised on 26 July 1993.

== See also ==
- Monetary reform in the Soviet Union, 1922–24
- Monetary reform in the Soviet Union, 1947
- Pavlov Reform, 1991
- Monetary reform in Russia, 1993
- Monetary reform in Russia, 1998

== Bibliography ==
- "Monetary reform of 1961". Russian Portal (in Russian). Archived from the original on 1 March 2011.
