= Pavlov Reform =

Monetary reform of 1991 (known also as Pavlov Reform) was the last such reform in the Soviet Union. The reform retired and confiscated large-denomination bills to attempt to dampen inflation and combat the black market within the Soviet Union. It began on January 22, 1991. Its architect was Minister of Finance Valentin Pavlov, who was to become the last prime minister of the Soviet Union on January 14, 1991.

== Overview ==
On 22 January 1991, President of the USSR Mikhail Gorbachev signed a decree where the 1961-issued large-denomination banknotes, the 50 ruble and 100 ruble banknote, to be retired and removed from circulation.

All banknotes were to be exchanged for smaller denomination bills, with an unrestricted 1000 ruble exchange limit, roughly equivalent to the monthly salary. The exchange deadline was 3 days from January 23 to January 25.

== Results ==
After the decree was reported on television, on 23 January 1991, a crowd gathered and started besieging banks to exchange their bills to smaller variants. As banks were not informed of the decree, and with limited money, they refused to open, while lines were starting to form. Soviet Police was summoned to maintain order. Ruslan Khasbulatov said that: "The utter immorality of this decree is bound to cost the central government what little confidence people still have in it."

The governmental plan of confiscating 30 billion rubles failed as only 14 billion roubles were withdrawn from circulation. More economical reforms under Pavlov's leadership continued, described by Sandeip Khakase as "shock therapy" reforms and deemed unpopular. On April 2, prices for products were increased by 3 times, while wages were only increased by 20-30%, causing many workers to lose jobs.

== See also ==
- Monetary reform in the Soviet Union, 1922–24
- Monetary reform in the Soviet Union, 1947
- Monetary reform in the Soviet Union, 1961
- Monetary reform in Russia, 1993
- Monetary reform in Russia, 1998
- 2016 Indian banknote demonetisation
