= Igor Cașu =

Moldovan historian (born 1973)

- Born: October 8, 1973 (age 52); Borogani
- Citizenship: Moldova
- Education: University of Iași (MA, PhD)
- Occupation: Historian
- Employer: Moldova State University
- Known for: deputy head of the Commission for the Study of the Communist Dictatorship in Moldova
- Title: Professor of History

Igor Cașu (born 8 October 1973) is a historian from the Republic of Moldova.

== Early life and education ==
Igor Cașu was born on October 8, 1973, in Borogani, district Comrat, now in Leova. He studied history for three years at the State University of Moldova and then transferred to University of Iași, where he graduated with an MA in history in 1995 and subsequently defended his PhD at the same university – University of Iași - in 2000. The subjects of his Ph.D. were Soviet nationalities and politics in Moldavia from 1944 to 1989.

== Career ==
In the 2000 fall semester, he was Fulbright Scholar-in-Residence at Lenoir-Rhyne College in Hickory, North Carolina, teaching courses on Balkan history and politics in the 20th century.

He contributed in 2006 to the Presidential Commission for the Study of the Communist Dictatorship in Romania as an expert on the former Moldavian SSR.

Igor Cașu has also been deputy Chair of the Commission for the Analysis of the Totalitarian Communist Regime in the Republic of Moldova, designated by Presidential Decree signed by the Acting President of Moldova, Mihai Ghimpu.

In October 2010, he became (founding) Director of the Center for the Study of Totalitarianism at the Faculty of History and Philosophy, State University of Moldova in Chişinău. He contributed for Radio Free Europe (2010–2011), Romanian-language section. as well as to Romanian daily Adevărul (2010-2014), Chişinău edition.

== Works ==
=== Bibliography ===
- Duşmanul de clasă. Represiuni politice, violență și rezistență în R(A)SS Moldovenească, 1924–1956 \[Class Enemy: Political Repressions, Violence, and Resistance in the Moldavian (A)SSR], Chișinău: Cartier, 2014, 396 p. \(https://www.academia.edu/616126) Summary in English]
- Încă din zorii sovietizării Basarabiei. Identificarea "dușmanului de clasă", confiscarea proprietății și mobilizarea muncii, 1940–1941. Colecție de documente \[At the Origins of Sovietization of Bessarabia. Identification of "class enemy", confiscation of property, and work mobilization], Chișinău: Cartier, 2014, 458 p. \(https://www.academia.edu/7393697) Summary in multiple languages]
- Republica Moldova de la Perestroikă la independență, 1989–1991. Documente secrete din arhiva CC a PCM \[The Republic of Moldova from Perestroika to Independence], Chișinău: Cartdidact, 2011, 692 p. (with Igor Țărțv) \(https://www.academia.edu/4183904) Full text]
- Fără termen de prescripție. Aspecte ale crimelor comunismului în Europa \[No Statute of Limitations. Aspects of Communist Crimes in Europe], Chișinău: Cartier, 2011, 780 p. (co-edited with Sergiu Musteață)
- Al Doilea Război Mondial în Estul și Vestul Europei. Istorie și memorie \[World War II in Eastern and Western Europe], Chișinău: Cartier, 2013, 332 p. (co-edited with Diana Dumitru, Andrei Cușco, Petru Negură)

=== Peer-reviewed journal articles ===
- Discontent and Uncertainty in the Borderlands: Soviet Moldavia and the Secret Speech, 1956–1957, with Mark Sandle, in *Europe-Asia Studies*, vol. 66, no. 4, 2014, pp. 613–644. \(https://www.academia.edu/6931057) Summary]
- Political Repressions in Moldavian SSR after 1956: Towards a Typology Based on KGB Files, in *Dystopia. Journal of Totalitarian Ideologies and Regimes*, vol. 1–2, 2012, pp. 89–127. \(https://www.academia.edu/4921186) Full text]
- Was the Soviet Union an Empire? A View from Chișinău, in *Dystopia*, vol. 1–2, 2012, pp. 277–290. \(https://www.academia.edu/1055280) Full text]
- Le Goulag Bessarabien: Deportations, Repressions, Famine, 1940–1953, in *Communisme* (Paris), no. 91–92, 2007, pp. 129–138. \(https://www.academia.edu/3049764) Full text]
- Stalinist Terror in Soviet Moldavia, 1940–1953, in Kevin McDermott and Matthew Stibbe (eds.), *Stalinist Terror in Eastern Europe*, Manchester University Press, 2010, pp. 39–56.

=== Other academic contributions ===
- "Politica națională" în Moldova Sovietică, 1944–1989 \[Nationalities Policy in Soviet Moldavia], Chișinău: Cartdidact, 2000, 214 p. \(https://www.academia.edu/377397) Summary in English and Russian]
- Textbook: World History and History of Romanians, Chișinău: Cartier, 2013, 144 p. (co-authored with Igor Țărțv, Virgil Pâslariuc, Flavius Solomon, Pavel Cerbușcă).

=== Selected thematic papers ===
- Conflicte între Ministerul de Interne (MVD) și Securitatea Statului (MGB) în ajunul și în timpul deportării din iulie 1949, various editions in Romanian and Russian.
- Foametea din anii 1946–1947 din RSS Moldovenească: cauze și consecințe \[The Mass Famine in Moldavian SSR, 1946–1947: Causes and Consequences], multiple academic versions available in Romanian and Russian.
- Marea Teroare în RASS Moldovenească, 1937–1938: context intern și extern; operațiuni "culăcească" și "română"; represiuni față de nomenclatură; probe ale torturii/violenței \[The Great Terror in Moldavian ASSR, 1937–1938].
