= Borogani =

- Commune
- Location within Moldova
- Coordinates: 46°22′16″N 28°31′18″E
- Country: Moldova
- District: Leova District

Government
  - Mayor: Elena Savițki (PDM)

Area
  - Total: 6.4 km^{2} (2.5 sq mi)
- Elevation: 90 m (300 ft)

Population (2014 census)
  - Total: 3,708
- Time zone: UTC+2 (EET)
  - Summer (DST): UTC+3 (EEST)
- Postal code: MD-6335

Borogani is a village in Leova District, Moldova.
