= Commodity loan rate =

The commodity loan rate is the price per unit (pound, bushel, bale, or hundredweight) at which the Commodity Credit Corporation (CCC) provides commodity loans to farmers to enable them to hold commodities for later sale, to realize marketing loan gains, or to receive loan deficiency payments (LDPs). Marketing assistance loan rates for the “loan commodities” and peanuts for crop years 2002 through 2007 are specified in the 2002 farm bill (P.L. 107- 171, Sec. 1202, 1307). Nonrecourse loans also are available from the Commodity Credit Corporation for refined beet and raw cane sugar.

Even when the market price of the commodity is less than the loan rate, the government is forced to accept forfeiture of the crop in full satisfaction of the loan obligation.

The Commodity Credit Corporation's main tool for bolstering the price of programmed crops is the non-recourse loan.
