= Monetary reform in the Soviet Union, 1947 =

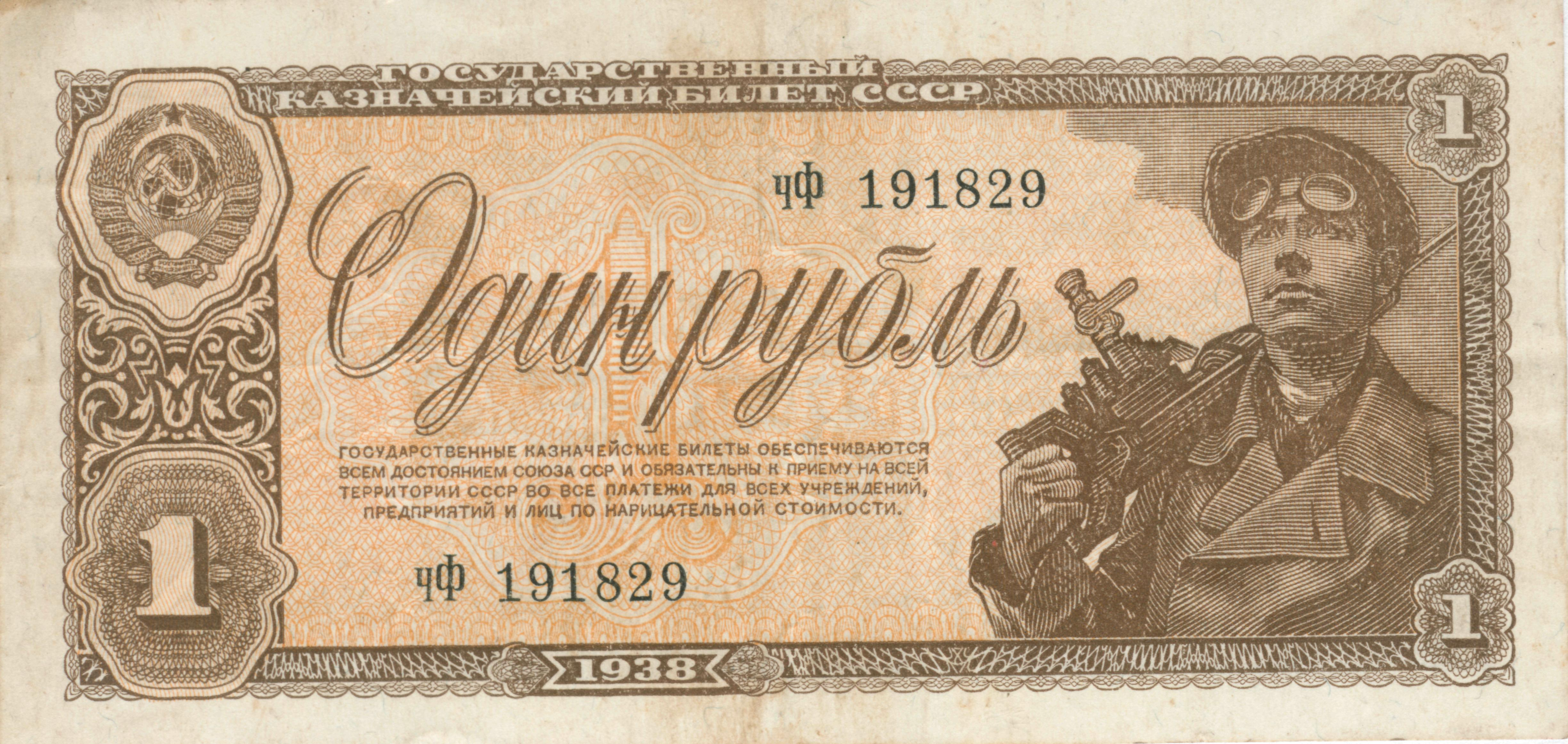
1 rouble, 1938

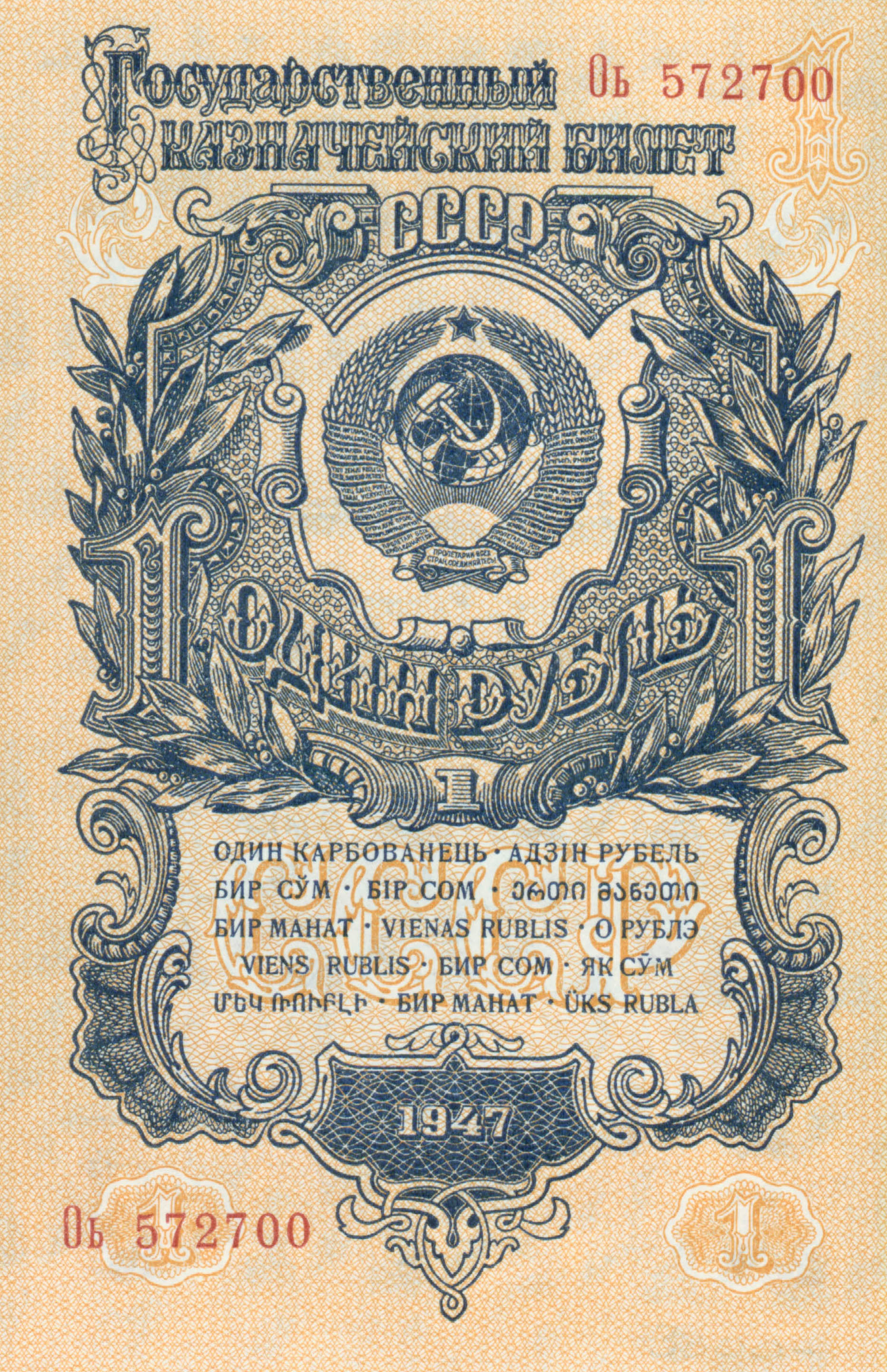
1 rouble, 1947

The monetary reform in the Soviet Union of 1947 (known as the "postwar reform") was carried out during December 16–19, 1947. It was the second Soviet monetary reform. At the same time the post-World War II rationing system was discontinued. The reform was a combination of redenomination and confiscation, the latter depending on the amount exchanged and whether the monies were kept at the State Labor Savings Banks System of the USSR or not. Amounts under 3,000 Rbls in private bank accounts were not revalued while cash had to be exchanged 10:1 for new roubles. State bonds were exchanged as well, under more favourable to government (politburo) rules of denomination. The confiscative character was attributed to large amounts of counterfeit money produced by Nazi Germany, as well as to the desire to devalue the savings of the profiteers and enrich the government.

== Background ==
The Great Patriotic War placed a heavy burden on the USSR's finances. To conduct military operations and rebuild the economy on a war footing, large funds were required, which led to an increase in the budget deficit. For example, in 1941 it amounted to 19.2 billion rubles, despite the increase in the tax pressure on the population (mandatory and voluntary payments of the population to the treasury increased from 20.9 billion rubles in 1940 to 79.2 billion rubles in 1944). At the first stage of the war, the state was forced to resort to the printing press to cover the budget deficit. The budget deficit of 1941 was covered by 13.9 billion rubles. through the issue of paper money. The situation was aggravated by a sharp decrease in commodity funds in the hands of the state, and consequently, a decrease in the volume of retail turnover of state and cooperative trade, which in 1943 amounted to only 82 billion rubles. (in 1940 the volume of trade turnover was 176 billion rubles). The majority of the population, receiving an insufficient amount of food and industrial goods of mass demand on cards, was forced to turn to the services of the “free”, or, as it was called in official documents, the collective farm market, the rise in prices on which reflected the fall in the purchasing power of the ruble. The price index of the collective farm market in 1943 was 1294 (price index for 1940 = 100). As a result, during the war the volume of cash money supply rapidly increased - from 18.4 billion to 73.9 billion rubles.

The card distribution system in force since 1941 and the increasing role of the collective farm (“free”) market in supplying the population with consumer goods created favorable opportunities during the war years for the accelerated development of the “illegal” market, i.e. systems of commodity-money flows interacting with each other and with the legal market, not controlled by the state. The rise in prices for essential products forced the majority of the urban population to seek additional sources of income, in addition to those received from the state, which thereby involved them in the turnover of the “illegal” market. For example, in 1943, according to estimates by specialists from the USSR Ministry of Finance, only 13% of all expenses of the non-agricultural population for the purchase of goods on the collective farm market were made from ordinary income, and the remaining 87% of expenses were from market revenues, including sales household items on the market and goods purchased in government trade. By the end of the war, the development of the “illegal” market of the USSR rose to a new qualitative level, which was particularly manifested in the formation of a hierarchical structure of participants in the “illegal” market. The top layer of the structure became the “businessmen”, who concentrated significant material and monetary resources in their hands and already enjoyed significant socio-economic influence in society. Official documents also testified to the emergence of a new social group. Thus, in a memo addressed to the Deputy Chairman of the Council of People's Commissars of the USSR V.M. Molotov, Deputy Chairman of the USSR State Planning Committee G. Kosyachenko noted the accumulation of large free funds by “certain layers of the urban population, including persons providing all kinds of services to the population, often illegally, persons engaged in resale and speculative transactions.”

During the period of maximum increase, prices on the collective farm market were 17 times higher than the average price level of the peaceful 1940 year. With an average salary of 400-450 rubles, a kilogram of potatoes at the market in the city of Nizhny Novgorod in January 1943 cost 40 rubles. The price of a liter of milk in Nizhny Novgorod ranged from 18 to 60 rubles, a kilogram of pork - from 44 to 512 rubles. They asked for more than 1,000 rubles for a bottle of vodka, which exceeded the salary of a skilled worker. Champagne cost 160 rubles, but the majority of the population did not have money to buy a sparkling drink. Vodka production fell fivefold during the war, and most of the alcohol was received by the Red Army in the form of a daily “People's Commissar” portion of 100 grams.

Manufactured goods and fabric remained in short supply, fights broke out near department stores, and stores turned into “a menagerie of speculators of all kinds.” A resident of Nizhny Novgorod bought a piece of wool for a suit for 900 rubles and immediately resold it for 3 and a half thousand. “Bag men” appeared again, going to the nearest villages to exchange food. People returned to natural exchange, and money did not have much value in the village. So, Saratov women knitted stockings, after which they exchanged them in the villages for millet.

In 1944, a system of Osobtorg stores was deployed in the USSR, selling rare and high-quality goods. In Moscow, the new structure had 20 food stores and 50 restaurants. Mostly representatives of the pro-government intelligentsia, scientists and engineers, and high-ranking officials of the Red Army came here. For 100 grams of sugar they asked for 55 rubles. Bright storefronts and exorbitant price tags infuriated ordinary people. Ordinary workers went to commercial stores exclusively on excursions: “How long can we live when there are thousands of businessmen and all sorts of newly-minted bosses around us, shouting about abstinence, fighting at three throats and having no idea what need is?”.

== Preparation of monetary reform ==
Preparations for monetary reform began during the war in an atmosphere of great secrecy. According to the memoirs of the then People's Commissar of Finance Arseny Zverev, the start of preparation was initiated by Joseph Stalin at the end of 1943. Work on the monetary reform project was entrusted to the Monetary Circulation Group, formed as part of the People's Commissariat of Finance of the USSR, headed by the prominent Soviet economist of that time V.P. Dyachenko. A year later, at the end of 1944, at a meeting of the Politburo of the Central Committee of the All-Union Communist Party of Bolsheviks, the first results were reported. At the end of the war, objective prerequisites for improving monetary circulation appeared: the budget deficit was eliminated, and the turnover of state and cooperative trade increased. From the very beginning of its activities, the Monetary Circulation Group paid great attention to the role of “illegal” market “dealers” in the emerging monetary reform. This was facilitated by information received by the People's Commissariat of Finance of the USSR from the field. So, in July 1945, in a memo by V.P. Dyachenko addressed to Zverev notes that, starting from 1943, the USSR People's Commissariat of Finance began to receive letters from various citizens, in which “the accumulation of large sums of money was noted in the hands of speculative elements.” People of various professions living in different regions of the country demanded that speculators be deprived of the opportunity to use their money savings after the war, when prices would fall significantly.

At the end of 1944, the Group prepared the first version of the monetary reform project in the form of a memorandum dated December 19, 1944. It notes that significant amounts of money (according to the authors, approximately half of the cash supply) are concentrated in a small part of the population. The formation of these capitals is associated with income of a speculative, sometimes illegal nature. The authors of the report consider the “illegal” market as an important component, although very undesirable, of the country’s domestic market. The method of carrying out monetary reform was determined by the task set by the country's leadership of shifting the inevitable losses of the population during the exchange of money to the greatest extent to holders of capital acquired through speculative means. A high exchange rate (1:15), calculated from the ratio of market (commercial) prices and prices of normalized supply, as well as the one-time issue of a new Soviet currency and its exchange for banknotes of previous issues in a short time, planned as the main method of carrying out monetary reform, served the purpose not so much of improving monetary circulation as of undermining the economic power of the “dealers” of the “illegal” market. To accomplish the task of improving monetary circulation, according to the calculations of the same authors, it was enough to set the exchange rate at the rate of 3 - 4 rubles. in red currency for 1 rub. new money and use gradual measures related to the development of a commercial trade system and the implementation of appropriate tax policies to “absorb” the money supply. The authors of other alternative projects for monetary reform, which were considered during its preparation, also insisted on establishing a lower exchange rate during the currency reform. November 8, 1945 addressed to Zverev was sent a letter with a draft monetary reform prepared by professor of the Financial and Economic Institute A.G. Goykhbarg, which justified the exchange rate of 1:4.2. In May 1946, Chairman of the Board of the State Bank of the USSR Y. Golev, based on calculations according to which for “normal” economic turnover the necessary cash supply was calculated at 25–30 billion rubles, proposed establishing an exchange rate of 1:2.

From the end of 1944, the state began to take preparatory measures for monetary reform, aimed at reducing the cash supply and increasing state market funds. Already during the preparatory measures, a contradiction was revealed between solving the problems of improving monetary circulation and limiting the economic influence of the “dealers” of the “black” market. The first positive results in reducing the total amount of cash paper money not backed by commodity coverage were achieved on the basis of economic cooperation between the state and the wealthy sections of the population of the USSR, including holders of “shadow” capital. This was manifested in the development in the pre-reform years of the system of trading enterprises of Osobtorg, which began operating in large cities in May 1944. In the shops and supermarkets of Osobtorg, the population of the country, who had sufficient cash, could purchase food products that were in short supply at that time at commercial prices on free sale and industrial consumer goods. From the very beginning of the operation of these trading enterprises, the state showed itself as an entrepreneur, setting prices in accordance with the existing conditions of the domestic market. In cases where prices were set too high, which affected the growth of trade turnover of Osobtorg enterprises, prices were reduced to bring them closer to market prices. Thus, during 1946, prices in state commercial stores were reduced twice; at the same time, ration prices were increased in order to bring them closer to market prices, i.e. real prices. The turnover of the Osobtorg enterprises, which brought 4 billion rubles in revenue to the budget in the first quarter of 1946 alone, during 1946 amounted to 71,806 million rubles. The resulting profit allowed the state to withdraw 8 billion rubles from circulation in 1946, and another 2,4 billion rubles in 1947.

== Аctions of illegal dealers in response to monetary reform ==
Along with the state, the “illegal” market, primarily represented by its most organized part - the “dealers,” began preparations for monetary reform long before December 14, 1947. The main task that holders of large “shadow” capital had to solve was insuring them against depreciation during an exchange transaction. The direct developers of the monetary reform project, members of the Monetary Circulation Group, were well aware of the capabilities of the “dealers” of the “illegal” market and were skeptical about the state’s ability to control “shadow” capital during the exchange operation. Already in December 1944, they warned the country's leadership about this. that the government's attempts to limit the use of speculators' money during an exchange transaction will have "a number of complicating circumstances." One of the forms of insuring their capitals was their legalization in one form or another, for example, in the form of deposits in savings banks. This is evidenced by data from a sample survey of 10% of savings banks. In 1946 alone, the amount of population deposits in savings banks grew more than during all the years of the war, and amounted to 10,325 million rubles, of which 8,424.5 million rubles or 81.5% of the amount of deposits accounted for deposits exceeding 3 thousand rubles. As of December 1, 1947, there were already 16.5 billion rubles on deposits in savings banks. As the time for exchanging money approached, the excitement intensified among groups of the population that had significant amounts of cash, which, as can be seen from the documents (at least in large cities), had information about the upcoming monetary reform. For example, in the report of the USSR Ministry of Internal Affairs dated November 30, 1947, it was reported that “in recent days, rumors have spread in the city of Moscow that existing banknotes will be exchanged in the near future at the rate of 10-12 kopecks per ruble, and that at the same time prices for industrial goods sold at planned prices will be significantly increased.”

Having sufficient information about the procedure for carrying out the upcoming monetary reform, the owners of “shadow” capital in the months immediately preceding this took vigorous measures to insure their capital against depreciation. In November 1947, large cities reported mass purchases of material assets, primarily expensive items, including precious metals and antiques, by representatives of the wealthy segments of the population. So, if the usual daily revenue of Mosskuppromtorg stores was 2.5 million rubles, then on November 29, goods worth 13 million rubles were sold, including those (antiques, furs) that, due to their high cost, had not previously found a buyer. In the commercial stores of the Glavosobunivermag and in the markets of Moscow, the demand for expensive consumer goods (furs, fur products, high-quality fabrics - that is, essentially luxury goods for that time) increased, which led to an increase in prices for these goods. For example, a piece of suit fabric "Boston" worth 3,000 rubles. In November 1947, it was sold in Moscow markets for 6,500 rubles. In Mosyuvelirtorg stores, the demand for jewelry, primarily gold, has increased. On November 29 alone, 4 jewelry stores sold jewelry worth 1,750 thousand rubles.

In the period from the beginning of December 1947, i.e. the time immediately preceding the exchange of money, there was an increased influx of deposits into savings banks. According to Finance Minister Zverev, since the beginning of December, 150–200 million cash flows into the country's savings banks were received daily; the total influx of deposits into savings banks in December 1947 before the start of cash exchange amounted to approximately 2–2.5 billion rubles. An idea of who contributed money to savings banks at this time can be obtained from letters from USSR citizens who came to the USSR Ministry of Finance during the reform period. According to reports from the field, in almost all regions of the country in the first half of December 1947, queues lined up in cities wishing to deposit their “savings” in savings banks, mostly in large amounts. In letters from citizens, these individuals are characterized as speculators. Zverev in his memorandum addressed to Stalin also reported that those who deposit money in savings banks from the beginning of December 1947 are the owners of large sums of money and proposed that deposits made in savings banks after December 1, 1947 be revalued as cash, i.e. 1:10. This logical proposal from the point of view of the officially announced position of limiting exchange opportunities for speculators did not find support from the country's leadership. As can be seen from the explanation of the Deputy Prosecutor General of the USSR G. Safonov dated February 28, 1948, only deposits made after the publication of the Resolution on monetary reform were subject to an exchange of 1:10, i.e. after the cash exchange begins.

== Outcome ==
The “dealers” of the “illegal” market managed not only to retain most of their capital during the reform, but also to significantly increase it, taking advantage of the pre-reform excitement among the population. Already from the beginning of 1947, local reports began to come in about mass purchases of government bonds by representatives of the “illegal” market at reduced prices. Deputy of the Supreme Soviet of the USSR Ignatov reported on increased speculation in government bonds at bazaars in Krasnodar, proposing to resume the purchase of bonds from the population in savings banks. This proposal, of course, was not accepted, since the lion's share of the state internal debt was simply planned to be canceled during the reform. As a result, a kind of “stock exchange game” on government bonds of old issues continued until the start of the reform. The reform itself was used by representatives of “shadow” capital to quickly get rich as a result of playing on the difference in prices for goods that were in short supply at that time before and after the abolition of the card system. According to the report of the Ministry of Internal Affairs of the USSR dated March 2, 1948, for the period from December 16, 1947 to February 15, 1948, the theft of inventory items worth more than 50 million rubles by criminals was revealed. Approximately the same amount of material assets was confiscated from them during the search. The main method of obtaining a quick profit was to hide goods for their subsequent sale at new prices, as well as depositing large sums of cash that the “dealers” had in old-style money for the purpose of reselling a batch of goods after the reform in new-style money. For example, the managers of a store and warehouse in the city of Zugdidi, Georgian SSR, deposited 230,560 rubles into the store’s cash register. in old-style money, accordingly withdrawing goods from the store for this amount. A favorable moment for the “dealers” of the “illegal” market was the temporary lack of cash for the majority of the population to purchase scarce goods, which, after the abolition of the card system, were freely sold in stores. In letters from citizens sent to the USSR Ministry of Finance, it was reported that after December 16, 1947, when the majority of the population lost the remnants of their November wages, owners of large sums of money bought in stores all the best and scarce goods for further resale of these goods at increased prices. It is not surprising that many people “living on one salary” have the impression that monetary reform is being carried out in the interests of black market moneybags. Thus, in a letter from the Ivanov family, it is stated that the Decree on monetary reform is directed against the bulk of the population, who lost their “penny” savings during the reform, and provides powerful support to profiteers who, through theft and extortion, siphon tens of thousands of rubles from the working people and the state.

== See also ==
- Monetary reform in the Soviet Union, 1922–24
- Monetary reform in the Soviet Union, 1961
- Pavlov Reform, 1991
- Monetary reform in Russia, 1993
- Monetary reform in Russia, 1998
- Banking in the Soviet Union
