= Redenomination =

Process of changing the face value of a currency unit

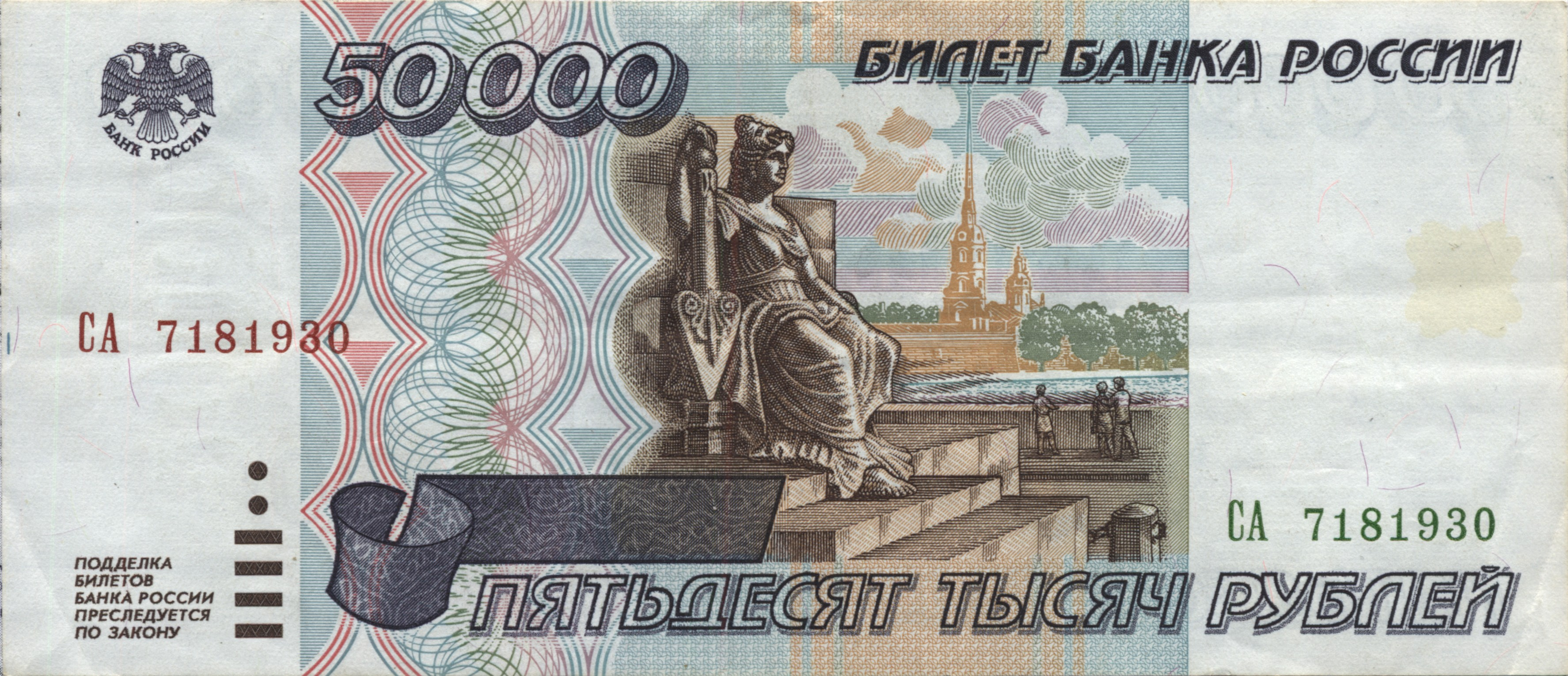
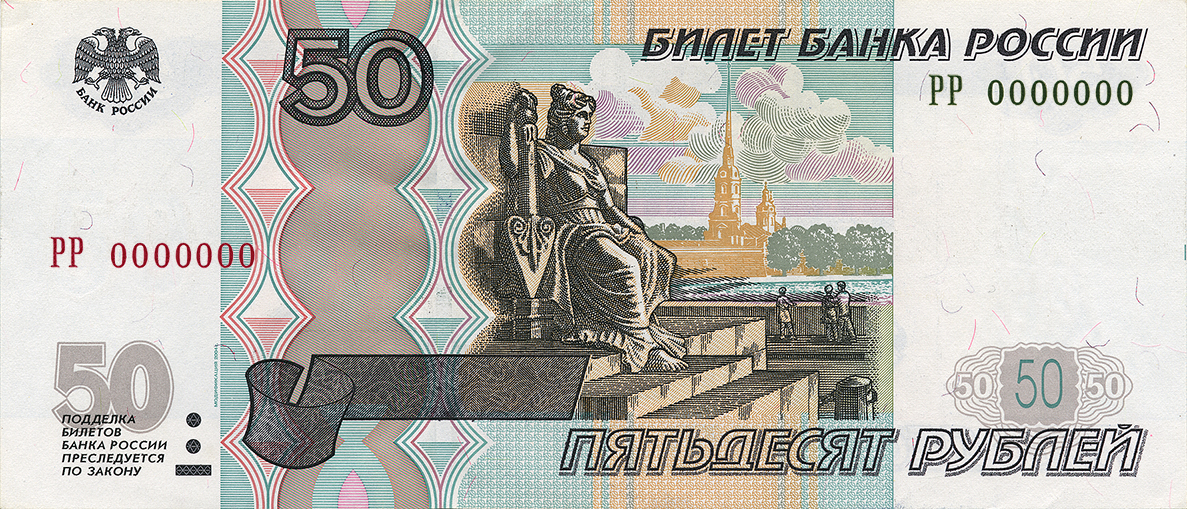
50,000 Russian ruble banknotes (top) were redenominated into 50 ruble banknotes (bottom) during the 1998 monetary reform.

In monetary economics, redenomination is the process of changing the face value of banknotes and coins in circulation. It may be done because inflation has made the currency unit so small that only large denominations of the currency are in circulation. In such cases the name of the currency may change or the original name may be used with a temporary qualifier such as "new". Redenomination may be done for other reasons such as changing over to a new currency such as the Euro or during decimalisation.

Redenomination itself is considered symbolic as it does not have any impact on a country's exchange rate in relation to other currencies. It may, however, have a psychological impact on the population by suggesting that a period of hyperinflation is over, and is not a reminder of how much inflation has impacted them. The reduction in the number of zeros also improves the image of the country abroad.

Inflation over time is the main cause for the purchasing power of the monetary unit decreasing; but there are a variety of political reasons for the government not reining in inflation or for not redenominating the currency when its value has depreciated significantly. There are some economic and social benefits of redenominating, including improved efficiency in processing routine transactions. Redenomination typically involves the substitution of new banknotes in place of the old ones, which usually cease being legal tender after the end of a short transition period.

== Inflation ==
In general, redenomination is implemented in response to hyperinflation, which progressively increases the nominal prices of products and services, decreasing the real value of the monetary unit in the local market. Over time, prices become excessively large, which can impede routine transactions because of the risk and inconvenience of carrying stacks of bills, or the strain on systems, e.g. automatic teller machines (ATMs), or because human psychology does not handle large numbers well. Authorities may alleviate this problem by redenomination: introducing a new unit that replaces the old unit, with a fixed number of old units being converted to 1 new unit. If inflation is the reason for redenomination, this ratio is much larger than 1, usually a positive integral power of 10 like 100, 1000 or 1 million, and the procedure can be referred to as "cutting zeroes". Recent examples of redenominations include:

New unit	=	×	Old unit	Year
Argentine peso (ARP)	=	10 000	Argentine peso ley (ARY)	1983
Argentine austral (ARA)	=	1 000	Argentine peso (ARP)	1985
Argentine peso (ARS)	=	10 000	Argentine austral (ARA)	1992
New Polish złoty (PLN)	=	10 000	old Polish złoty (PLZ)	1995
Fourth Romanian leu (RON)	=	10 000	third Romanian leu (ROL)	2005
New Mozambican metical (MZN)	=	1 000	old metical (MZM)	2006
Second Zimbabwean dollar (ZWN)	=	1 000	first dollar (ZWD)	2006
Third Zimbabwean dollar (ZWR)	=	10 000 000 000	second dollar (ZWN)	2008
Fourth Zimbabwean dollar (ZWL)	=	1 000 000 000 000	third dollar (ZWR)	2009
This table is not exhaustive.

Although the ratio is often a positive integral power of 10 (i.e., removing some zeros), sometimes it can be a×10^{n} where a is a single-digit integer and n is a positive integer. Partial examples include:

New unit	=	×	Old unit	Year
German Rentenmark	=	1 000 billion	Papiermark	1923
Chinese gold yuan	=	3 million	old yuan	1948
Chinese silver yuan	=	500 million	Chinese gold yuan	1949
New Taiwan dollar	=	40 000	old dollar	1949
Azerbaijani new manat	=	5 000	old manat	2006
This table is not exhaustive.

Occasionally, the ratio is defined in a way such that the new unit is equal to a hard currency. As a result, the ratio may not be based on an integer. Examples include:

New unit	=	×	Old unit	=	Anchor currency	year
Brazilian real	=	2 750	cruzeiros reais	=	United States dollar	1 July 1994
Yugoslav novi dinar	=	10~13 million	1994 dinara	=	Deutsche Mark	24 January 1994
2nd Polish złoty	=	1.8 million	Polish marka	=	Swiss franc	1 April 1924
This table is not exhaustive.

In the case of hyperinflation, the ratio can go as high as millions or billions, to a point where scientific notation is used for clarity or long and short scales are mentioned to disambiguate which kind of billion or trillion is meant.

In the case of chronic inflation which is expected to continue, the authorities have a choice between a large redenomination ratio and a small redenomination ratio. If a small ratio is used, another redenomination may soon be required, which will entail costs in the financial, accounting, and computing industries. However a large ratio may result in inconveniently large or small prices at some point in the cycle.

After a redenomination, the new unit often has the same name as the old unit, with the addition of the word new. The word new may or may not be dropped a few years after the change. Sometimes the new unit is a completely new name, or a "recycled" name from previous redenomination or from ancient times.

New unit	=	×	Old unit	year	Nature of the new unit
Turkish new lira	=	1 million	old lira	2005	"new" is an official designation and was dropped in 2009.
New Taiwan dollar	=	40 000	old dollars	1949	"new" is an official designation and is still used in official documents today.
Argentine austral	=	1 000	Peso argentino	1985	completely new name
Yugoslav 1993 dinar	=	1 million	1992 dinara	1993	no official designation
Brazilian real	=	2 750	cruzeiros reais	1994	recycled unit of Brazil before 1942
This table is not exhaustive.

== Decimalisation ==
All countries that previously had currencies based on pounds-shillings-pence (£sd) system (£1 = 20 shillings = 240 pence) have now adopted decimal currencies (currencies related by powers of 10), with several changing the name of the main currency unit at the same time. As of 2020, only two currencies are non-decimal, being the Mauritanian ouguiya and Malagasy ariary, with one of each divided into five subdivisory units.

== Currency union ==
When countries form a currency union, redenomination may be required. The conversion ratio is often not a round number, and may be less than 1.

New unit	=	x	Old unit	year	Monetary union
Danish krone	=	0.5	Danish rigsdaler	1873	Scandinavian Monetary Union
Gulden österreichischer Währung	=	20/21	Gulden Conventions-Münze	1858	Wiener Münzvertrag between the states of the German Customs Union and the Austrian Empire
This table is not exhaustive.

=== List of Euro redenominations ===
The most notable currency union today is the Eurozone. In 2002, euros in cash form were introduced.

Country	Old unit	Exchange rate (old units per €)	Year
Belgium	Belgian franc	40.3399	1999
Luxembourg	Luxembourgish franc	40.3399	1999
Germany	Deutsche Mark	1.95583	1999
Andorra, Spain	Spanish peseta	166.386	1999
Andorra, France, Monaco	French franc	6.55957	1999
Ireland	Irish pound	0.787564	1999
Italy, San Marino, Vatican City	Italian lira	1936.27	1999
Netherlands	Dutch guilder	2.20371	1999
Austria	Austrian schilling	13.7603	1999
Portugal	Portuguese escudo	200.482	1999
Finland	Finnish markka	5.94573	1999
Greece	Greek drachma	340.75	2001
Slovenia	Slovenian tolar	239.64	2007
Cyprus	Cypriot pound	0.585274	2008
Malta	Maltese lira	0.4293	2008
Slovakia	Slovak koruna	30.126	2009
Estonia	Estonian kroon	15.6466	2011
Latvia	Latvian lats	0.702804	2014
Lithuania	Lithuanian litas	3.4528	2015
Croatia	Croatian kuna	7.5345	2023
Bulgaria	Bulgarian lev	1.95583	2026

== List of currency redenominations ==
This table lists various currency redenominations that have occurred, including currency renaming where the conversion rate is 1:1, but excluding decimalisation and joining the Eurozone, already listed on the table above.

New unit	Exchange rate (new∶old)	Old unit	Year	Country	Reason	Notes
Hungarian forint	1∶4×10^{29}	Hungarian pengő	1946	Hungary	Hyperinflation	This is a theoretical conversion rate, using 2×10^{21} pengő = 1 adópengő. The total value of all circulating pengő notes was less than 1/1000 of a forint or 1/10 of a fillér.
Rentenmark	1∶1×10^{12}	Papiermark	1923	Germany	Hyperinflation	
Zimbabwean dollar (4th)	1∶1×10^{12}	Zimbabwean dollar (3rd)	2009	Zimbabwe	Hyperinflation	Subsequently abandoned and replaced with Zimbabwean bond notes and the Zimdollar in February 2019 after a period of time in which numerous foreign currencies were used
Greek drachma (2nd)	1∶50,000,000,000	Greek drachma (1st)	1944	Greece	Hyperinflation	
Zimbabwean dollar (3rd)	1∶10,000,000,000	Zimbabwean dollar (2nd)	2008	Zimbabwe	Hyperinflation	
Yugoslav 1994 dinar	1∶1,000,000,000	1993 dinara	1994	FR Yugoslavia	Hyperinflation	Lasted for 23 days.
3rd Krajina dinar	1∶1,000,000,000	2nd Krajina dinar	1994	Republic of Serbian Krajina	Hyperinflation	
Chinese "silver" yuan	1∶500,000,000	"gold" yuan	1949	China (Republic of China)	Hyperinflation	
Hungarian forint	1∶200,000,000	Hungarian adópengő	1946	Hungary	Hyperinflation	
Yugoslav novi dinar	1∶13,000,000	1994 dinara	1994	FR Yugoslavia	Hyperinflation	Anchor currency: Deutsche Mark
Nicaraguan córdoba (oro, 3rd)	1∶5,000,000	Nicaraguan córdoba (2nd)	1991	Nicaragua	Inflation	
Chinese "gold" yuan	1∶3,000,000	(old) yuan	1948	China (Republic of China)	Inflation	
Nouveau zaïre	1∶3,000,000	First Zaïre	1993	Democratic Republic of the Congo	Inflation	
Polish złoty (2nd)	1∶1,800,000	Polish marka	1924	Poland	Hyperinflation	Anchor currencies: Swiss franc (equal in value, but not pegged) and United States dollar (pegged $1 = 5.18 zł); To limit production costs of coins, only banknotes were printed until November 1924. To further limit such costs, 500,000-mark and 10,000,000-mark notes were cut in two and overprinted 1 GROSZ and 5 GROSZY in red.
Boliviano	1∶1,000,000	Peso boliviano	1985	Bolivia	Inflation	
Peruvian nuevo sol	1∶1,000,000	Peruvian inti	1991	Peru	Hyperinflation	The "nuevo" designation lasted until 2015.
Yugoslav 1993 dinar	1∶1,000,000	1992 dinara	1993	FR Yugoslavia	Hyperinflation	no official designation
2nd Krajina dinar	1∶1,000,000	1st Krajina dinar	1993	Republic of Serbian Krajina	Hyperinflation	
Georgian lari	1∶1,000,000	Georgian kuponi	1995	Georgia	Hyperinflation	
Second Kwanza	1∶1,000,000	Kwanza reajustado	1999	Angola	Inflation	
Transnistrian ruble (3rd)	1∶1,000,000	Transnistrian ruble (2nd)	2001	Transnistria	Hyperinflation	
Turkish new lira	1∶1,000,000	Turkish lira	2005	Turkey	Inflation	The "new" designation lasted until 2009.
Venezuelan bolívar (4th)	1∶1,000,000	Venezuelan bolívar (3rd)	2021	Venezuela	Hyperinflation	
Hryvnia	1∶100,000	3rd Ukrainian karbovanets	1996	Ukraine	Inflation	
Second Congolese franc	1∶100,000	Nouveau zaïre	1998	Democratic Republic of the Congo	Inflation	
Bolívar Soberano	1∶100,000	Bolivar Fuerte	2018	Venezuela	Hyperinflation	
4th Soviet ruble	1∶50,000	3rd Soviet ruble	1924	Soviet Union	Hyperinflation	To stop hyperinflation, the new currency was backed by gold.
New Taiwan dollar	1∶40,000	Taiwan dollars	1949	Taiwan (Republic of China)	Inflation	"new" is an official designation and is still used in official documents
United States dollar	1∶25,000	Sucre	2000	Ecuador	Inflation	Full dollarization for banknotes. Ecuador also issues centavo coins.
Hungarian pengő	1∶12,500	Hungarian korona	1927	Hungary	Inflation	
2nd Soviet ruble	1∶10,000	1st Soviet ruble	1922	Soviet Union	Hyperinflation	A superunit, called a chervonets (червонец) was also introduced that year. It was worth 10 rubles.
Austrian schilling	1∶10,000	Austrian krone	1925	Austria	Inflation	
Second Renminbi yuan	1∶10,000	First Renminbi yuan	1955	China (People's Republic of China)	Inflation	
Peso argentino	1∶10,000	Peso ley	1983	Argentina	Inflation	
Yugoslav 1990 dinar	1∶10,000	1966 dinara	1990	Yugoslavia	Inflation	
Peso (convertible)	1∶10,000	Austral	1992	Argentina	Inflation	
4th Polish złoty	1∶10,000	3rd Polish złoty	1995	Poland	Inflation	For 2 years after the redenomination, the old currency coexisted with the new one, so prices had to be denominated in both currencies.
Romanian leu (4th)	1∶10,000	Romanian leu (3rd)	2005	Romania	Inflation	
New Ghanaian cedi	1∶10,000	Cedi	2007	Ghana	Inflation	
Third Belarusian ruble	1∶10,000	Second Belarusian ruble	2016	Belarus	Inflation	
United States dollar	1∶~6,900	Indonesian rupiah	1999	United Nations Transitional Administration in East Timor	Start of UN administration	
Azerbaijani new manat	1∶5,000	Second Azerbaijani manat	2006	Azerbaijan	Inflation	
Turkmenistani new manat	1∶5,000	(old) manat	2009	Turkmenistan	Inflation	
Real	1∶2,750	Cruzeiro real	1994	Brazil	Inflation	Anchor currency: United States dollar
Cruzeiro (antigo)	1∶1,000	Real (old)	1942	Brazil	Inflation	The cruzeiro was an alternative name for one mil réis.
Greek drachma (3rd)	1∶1,000	Greek drachma (2nd)	1954	Greece	Inflation	
Chilean escudo	1∶1,000	First Chilean peso	1960	Chile	Inflation	
Peso boliviano	1∶1,000	First boliviano	1963	Bolivia	Inflation	
Rupiah (new)	1∶1,000	First rupiah	1965	Indonesia	Monetary unification	
Cruzeiro (novo)	1∶1,000	Cruzeiro (antigo)	1967	Brazil	Inflation	
First zaïre	1∶1,000	First congolese franc	1967	Democratic Republic of the Congo	Inflation	
Nuevo peso	1∶1,000	Peso moneda nacional	1973	Uruguay	Inflation	
Chilean peso	1∶1,000	Chilean escudo	1975	Chile	Inflation	
Argentine austral	1∶1,000	Argentine peso (1983)	1985	Argentina	Inflation	
Peruvian inti	1∶1,000	Peruvian sol (1863)	1985	Peru	Inflation	
Cruzado	1∶1,000	Cruzeiro (novo)	1986	Brazil	Inflation	
New Shekel	1∶1,000	Shekel	1986	Israel	Inflation	
Nicaraguan córdoba (2nd)	1∶1,000	Nicaraguan córdoba (1st)	1988	Nicaragua		
Cruzado Novo	1∶1,000	Cruzado	1989	Brazil	Inflation	
Cruzeiro real	1∶1,000	Cruzeiro (third)	1993	Brazil	Inflation	
Nuevo peso mexicano	1∶1,000	Peso mexicano	1993	Mexico	Inflation	"nuevo" was a temporary designation dropped in 1996
Moldovan leu	1∶1,000	Moldovan cupon	1993	Moldova	Inflation	
Peso uruguayo	1∶1,000	Nuevo peso	1993	Uruguay	Inflation	
Croatian kuna	1∶1,000	Croatian dinar	1994	Croatia		
2nd Uzbekistani soum	1∶1,000	1st Uzbekistani soum	1994	Uzbekistan	Inflation	
Kwanza reajustado	1∶1,000	Novo kwanza	1995	Angola	Inflation	
Second Russian ruble	1∶1,000	First Russian ruble	1998	Russia	Inflation	
Bulgarian new lev	1∶1,000	Bulgarian lev	1999	Bulgaria	Inflation	Anchor currency: German mark
Tajikistani somoni	1∶1,000	Tajikistani ruble	2000	Tajikistan	Inflation	
Surinamese dollar	1∶1,000	Surinamese guilder	2004	Suriname	Inflation	Old coins denominated in cents were declared to be worth their face value in the new cents.
New Mozambican metical	1∶1,000	(old) meticais	2006	Mozambique	Inflation	
Zimbabwean dollar (2nd)	1∶1,000	Zimbabwean dollar (1st)	2006	Zimbabwe	Inflation	
Second Sudanese pound	1∶1,000	First Sudanese pounds	2007	Sudan	Inflation	Currency unification (peace treaty)
Bolivar Fuerte	1∶1,000	(old) Bolivar	2008	Venezuela	Inflation	
Zambian kwacha	1∶1,000	(old) Kwacha	2013	Zambia	Inflation	
São Tomé and Príncipe dobra (2nd)	1∶1,000	São Tomé and Príncipe dobra (1st)	2018	São Tomé and Príncipe	Inflation	
Sierra Leonean leone	1∶1,000	(old) Sierra Leonean leone	2021	Sierra Leone	Inflation	
Liberation đồng	1∶500	Đồng	1975	South Vietnam	Fall of Saigon	
Turkmenistani manat	1∶500	7th Soviet ruble	1993	Turkmenistan	Break-up of the Soviet Union	
Kazakhstani tenge	1∶500	7th Soviet ruble	1993	Kazakhstan	Break-up of the Soviet Union	
3rd Haitian gourde	1∶300	2nd Haitian gourde	1872	Haiti		
2nd Latvian lats	1∶200	2nd Latvian rouble	1993	Latvia	Recycling old currency	
Kyrgyzstani som	1∶200	7th Soviet ruble	1993	Kyrgyzstan	Break-up of the Soviet Union	
Armenian dram	1∶200	7th Soviet ruble	1993	Armenia	Break-up of the Soviet Union	
3rd Soviet ruble	1∶100	2nd Soviet ruble	1923	Soviet Union	Hyperinflation	
3rd Polish złoty	1∶100	2nd Polish złoty	1949	Poland	Monetary reform	All bank assets were revalued at a ratio of 1∶100.
South Korean hwan	1∶100	first South Korean won	1954	Republic of Korea	Inflation after Korean War (1950–1953) and independence from Japan (1945)	
New French Franc	1∶100	French Franc	1960	France	Inflation	"New" was a temporary designation dropped in 1963
New Finnish markka	1∶100	Finnish markka	1963	Finland	Inflation	
Yugoslav 1966 dinar	1∶100	1944 dinara	1966	Yugoslavia	Inflation	
Peso ley	1∶100	Peso moneda nacional	1970	Argentina	Inflation	
Icelandic króna	1∶100	Icelandic króna	1981	Iceland	Hyperinflation	
Second Ugandan shilling	1∶100	First Ugandan shilling	1987	Uganda	Inflation	
Lithuanian litas	1∶100	Talonas	1993	Lithuania	Inflation	
Second Macedonian denar	1∶100	First Macedonian denar	1993	North Macedonia		
Tajikistani ruble	1∶100	First Russian ruble	1995	Tajikistan	Break-up of the Soviet Union	
Second Sudanese pound	1∶100	Sudanese dinars	2007	Sudan	Inflation	Currency unification (peace treaty)
North Korean won (2nd)	1∶100	North Korean won (1st)	2009	North Korea	Inflation	Redenomination by state
CFA franc	1∶65	Guinea-Bissau peso	1997	Guinea-Bissau	monetary union	West African CFA franc
Guatemalan quetzal	1∶60	Guatemalan peso	1925	Guatemala		
1st Latvian lats	1∶50	1st Latvian rouble	1922	Latvia	Approval of "Regulations on Money"	
Yugoslav 1944 dinar	1∶40	Independent State of Croatia kuna	1944	Yugoslavia		Reconstituted Yugoslav Federation dinar replacing currency in use in its constituents
Peso moneda nacional	1∶25	Peso moneda corriente	1881	Argentina	Inflation	
Yugoslav 1944 dinar	1∶20	Serbian 1941 dinar	1944	Yugoslavia		Reconstituted Yugoslav Federation dinar replacing currency in use in its constituents
Nicaraguan córdoba (1st)	1∶12.5	Nicaraguan peso	1912	Nicaragua		
2nd Haitian gourde	1∶10	1st Haitian gourde	1870	Haiti		
5th Soviet ruble	1∶10	4th Soviet ruble	1947	Soviet Union	Inflation	
6th Soviet ruble	1∶10	5th Soviet ruble	1961	Soviet Union	Monetary reform	
South Korean won (2nd)	1∶10	South Korean hwan	1963	Republic of Korea	Inflation	
Guinean syli	1∶10	Guinean franc (1st)	1971	Guinea		
Israeli shekel (1st)	1∶10	Israeli pound	1980	Israel	Inflation	
Talonas	1∶10	7th Soviet ruble	1991	Lithuania	Independence (from the Soviet Union)	No coins denominated in talonas were issued.
Estonian kroon	1∶10	7th Soviet ruble	1992	Estonia	Break-up of the Soviet Union	
Azerbaijani manat (2nd)	1∶10	7th Soviet ruble	1992	Azerbaijan	Break-up of the Soviet Union	
Sudanese dinar	1∶10	First Sudanese pounds	1992	Sudan	Inflation	Applied only to North Sudan
Yugoslav 1992 dinar	1∶10	1990 dinara	1992	FR Yugoslavia	Inflation	
First Belarusian ruble	1∶10	7th Soviet ruble	1994	Belarus	Break-up of the Soviet Union	When Soviet rubles were still in use in Belarus, Belarusian ruble denominations were implied to be ten times more than Soviet rubles.
Second Mauritanian ouguiya	1∶10	First Mauritanian ouguiya	2018	Mauritania	Inflation	The redenomination was an opportunity for the central bank to introduce more secure polymer banknotes.
United States dollar	1∶8.75	Colón	2001	El Salvador	dollarization	
1st Haitian gourde	1∶8.25	Haitian livre	1813	Haiti		8 livres and 5 sous. 1 sou was equal to 1/20 of a livre.
Peso moneda corriente	1∶8	Real	1826	Argentina		
Ouguiya	1∶5	CFA franc	1973	Mauritania		
Ariary	1∶5	Franc malgache	2005	Madagascar		From 1961, banknotes were issued denominated in both francs and ariary.
CFA franc	1∶4	Ekwele	1985	Equatorial Guinea	monetary union	Central African CFA franc
CFA franc	1∶2	Franc malien	1984	Mali	monetary union	West African CFA franc
Ghanaian cedi	1∶1.2	Old cedi	1967	Ghana	Decimalisation, change of government	This was an opportunity to remove Kwame Nkrumah from every denomination.
Hungarian korona	At par	Austro-Hungarian krone	1919	Hungary	Break-up of Austria-Hungary	
Austrian krone	At par	Austro-Hungarian krone	1920	Austria	Break-up of Austria-Hungary	
Mongolian tögrög	At par	4th Soviet ruble	1925	Mongolia		
First Guinean franc	At par	CFA franc	1959	Guinea	Independence	
Franc malien	At par	CFA franc	1962	Mali	Independence	
First Ugandan shilling	At par	East African shilling	1966	Uganda	Independence	
Peseta guineana	At par	Spanish peseta	1969	Equatorial Guinea	Independence	
First Kwanza	At par	Second Angolan escudo	1975	Angola	Independence	
Ekwele	At par	Peseta guineana	1975	Equatorial Guinea		
Guinea-Bissau peso	At par	Portuguese Guinean escudo	1975	Guinea-Bissau	Independence	
Franc guinéen	At par	Syli	1985	Guinea		
Novo kwanza	At par	First Kwanza	1990	Angola	seizure of money supply by government	Angolans could only exchange 5% of all old notes for new ones; they had to exchange the rest for government securities
Cruzeiro (third)	At par	Cruzado Novo	1990	Brazil	renaming	
7th Soviet ruble	At par	6th Soviet ruble	1991	Soviet Union	Monetary reform, money seizure	50-ruble and 100-ruble notes were withdrawn from circulation.
Croatian dinar	At par	Yugoslav 1990 dinar	1991	Croatia	Break-up of Yugoslavia	
Slovenian tolar	At par	Yugoslav 1990 dinar	1991	Slovenia	Break-up of Yugoslavia	
2nd Latvian rouble	At par	7th Soviet rouble	1992	Latvia	Lack of money supply	While Soviet roubles were still used in Latvia, it had to introduce its own currency to make its monetary policy independent.
Moldovan cupon	At par	7th Soviet ruble	1992	Moldova	Break-up of the Soviet Union	The cupon was a temporary currency, no coins were issued.
1st Krajina dinar	At par	Yugoslav 1992 dinar	1992	Republic of Serbian Krajina	Break-up of Yugoslavia	
1st Russian ruble	At par	7th Soviet ruble	1992	Russia	Break-up of the Soviet Union	
First Macedonian denar	At par	Yugoslav 1990 dinar	1992	North Macedonia	Break-up of Yugoslavia	The first denar was a temporary currency, no coins were issued
3rd Ukrainian karbovanets	At par	7th Soviet ruble	1992	Ukraine	Break-up of the Soviet Union	
Georgian kuponi	At par	7th Soviet ruble	1993	Georgia	Break-up of the Soviet Union	Only banknotes were issued.
1st Uzbekistani soum	At par	7th Soviet ruble	1993	Uzbekistan	Break-up of the Soviet Union	
Đồng (unified)	1∶0.8	Liberation đồng	1978	South Vietnam	Unification	
Austro-Hungarian krone	1∶0.5	Austro-Hungarian florin	1892	Austria-Hungary	monetary union	Moving from silver to gold standard
Iranian Rial	1∶0.1	Iranian Toman	1932	Iran	Monetary reform	

== Proposed ==
=== Colombia ===
Since 2018, there have been legislative efforts for redenomination.

=== Indonesia ===
A long-running proposal to redenominate the rupiah has yet to receive formal legislative consideration. Since 2010, Bank Indonesia, as the monetary authority of Indonesia, In 2015, the government submitted a rupiah redenomination bill to the House of Representatives, but it was put on ice for years. In 2017, the then-central bank governor Agus Martowardojo reiterated the call, saying that if redenomination started immediately, the process could be completed by 2024 or 2025.

In 2025, the redenomination bill was included in the National Legislative Program of the House of Representatives as a government-initiated proposal following a submission from the central bank. Finance Minister Purbaya Yudhi Sadewa had also signed a ministerial regulation outlining the framework for the bill, which targeted completion by 2027.

=== Iran ===
This proposal was approved by the Iranian parliament in May 2020. The changeover is likely to be phased over a period of up to two years.

=== Japan ===
Numerous proposals have been made since the 1990s to redenominate the yen by introducing a new unit or new yen, equal to 100 yen, and nearly worth one U.S. dollar. This has not happened to date, since the yen remains trusted globally despite its low unit value, and due to the huge costs of reissuing new currency and updating currency-reading hardware. The negative impact of postponing upgrades to various computer software until redenomination occurs, in particular, was also cited.

=== Lebanon ===
Due to Lebanese liquidity crisis, the Lebanese Pound has collapsed to nearly 90,000 for one dollar.

=== Nigeria ===
Due to inflation Nigerian coins are all essentially worthless now, so there are propositions to redenominate.

=== South Korea ===
There have been recurring proposals in the South Korean National Assembly to redenominate the won by introducing a new won or new unit, equal to 1,000 old won, and worth nearly one U.S. dollar. While proponents cite a more valuable currency unit better projects the strength of the nation's economy, a majority remain opposed to the idea. Reasons cited are: economic harm if done immediately, no issues on public confidence in the won and its inflation rate, limited cost savings, and the presence of more urgent economic issues.

=== Syria ===
In August 2025, it was announced that the Syrian government would revalue the currency by removing two zeros.

== Alternatives ==
Japanese invasion money suffered from heavy inflation. At the end of World War II governments of liberated countries and territories opted to simply declare them worthless.

In 2016, the Colombian peso was rated at around 3,000 per U.S. dollar, with banknotes up to 50,000 pesos. Instead of redenominating the currency, a new banknote design was introduced, with the last three zeroes replaced by the word "mil" (thousand), making the values easier to read.

== See also ==
- Decimalisation
- Denomination (currency)
- Devaluation
- Dollarization
