= Republika Srpska dinar =

Former currency of the Republika Srpska

Динар Републике Српске (Serbian); Dinar Republike Srpske (Serbian)

ISO 4217
- Code: None

Denominations
- Coins: None

Demographics
- Replaced: Yugoslav dinar
- Replaced by: Bosnia and Herzegovina convertible mark
- User(s): Republika Srpska

Issuance
- Central bank: National Bank of Republika Srpska
- This infobox shows the latest status before this currency was rendered obsolete.

The Republika Srpska dinar (Serbian: динар Републике Српске, romanized: dinar Republike Srpske) was the currency of Republika Srpska between 1992 and 1994 during the Bosnian War. There were two distinct currencies issued by the National Bank of the Republika Srpska. The first was introduced in 1992 in conjunction with the Yugoslav dinar in Serbia and Montenegro of that year, to which it was equal. The second was introduced on 1 October 1993, replacing the first at a rate of one million to one and matching the revaluation of the Yugoslav currency. Following this, the Republika Srpska used the Yugoslav dinar (first the "1994 dinar" and then "Novi dinar") until 1998, when the Bosnia and Herzegovina convertible mark was introduced.

The two currencies were only issued in note form, with the first issued in denominations of 10 dinars up to 10 billion dinars and the second in denominations of 5000 dinars up to 50 billion dinars. The designs of the banknotes varied very little within the issues of the two currencies. The "1992 dinar" notes featured the arms of the republic on both sides, whilst the "1993 dinar" notes had a portrait of Petar Kočić on the obverse. Some of the issues in 1993 were overprints on 1992 banknotes.

== See also ==
- Yugoslav dinar
- Krajina dinar
- Croatian dinar
- Bosnia and Herzegovina dinar
- Hyperinflation
