= Nuevo peso =

Nuevo peso ("new peso") may refer to:

- Mexican nuevo peso, denomination of currency in circulation in Mexico from January 1, 1993 to January 1, 1996.
- Uruguayan nuevo peso, currency in circulation in Uruguay from November 1975 to March 1, 1993.
