= Hyperinflation in early Soviet Russia =

Period of accelerated inflation

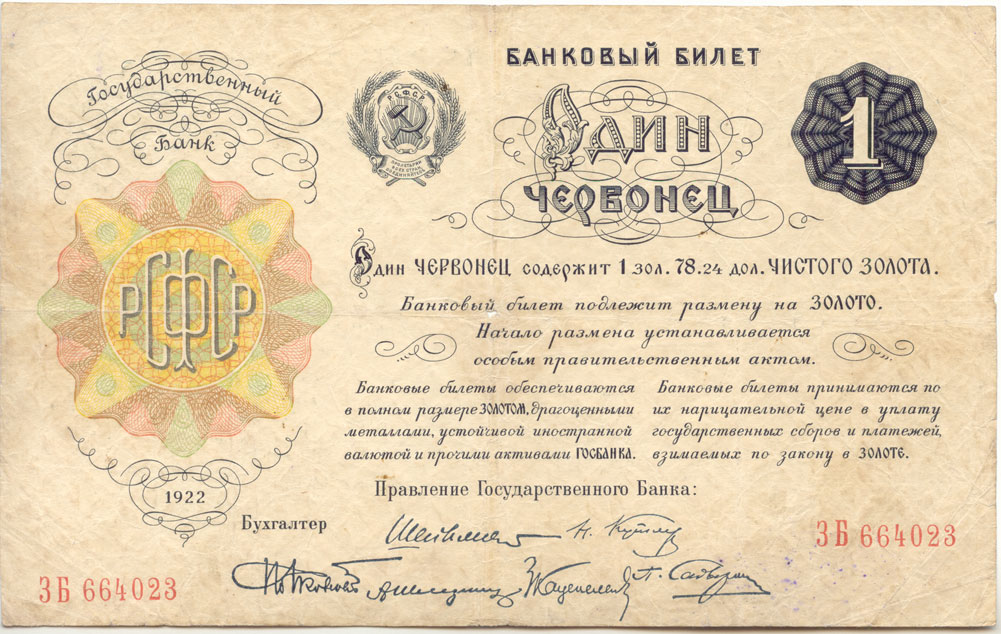
A specimen of a 1922 One Chervonets banknote. Hyperinflation in early Soviet Russia was ultimately halted by the adoption of such gold-backed currency.

In the early Soviet Union, there was a seven-year period of hyperinflation, running from the earliest days of the Bolshevik Revolution in November 1917 to the reestablishment of the gold standard with the introduction of the chervonets as part of the New Economic Policy. The inflationary crisis effectively ended in March 1924 with the introduction of the so-called "gold ruble" as the country's standard currency.

The early Soviet hyperinflationary period was marked by three successive redenominations of its currency, in which "new rubles" replaced old at the rates of 10,000-to-1 (January 1, 1922), 100-to-1 (January 1, 1923), and 50,000-to-1 (March 7, 1924), respectively.

== History ==
=== Overview ===
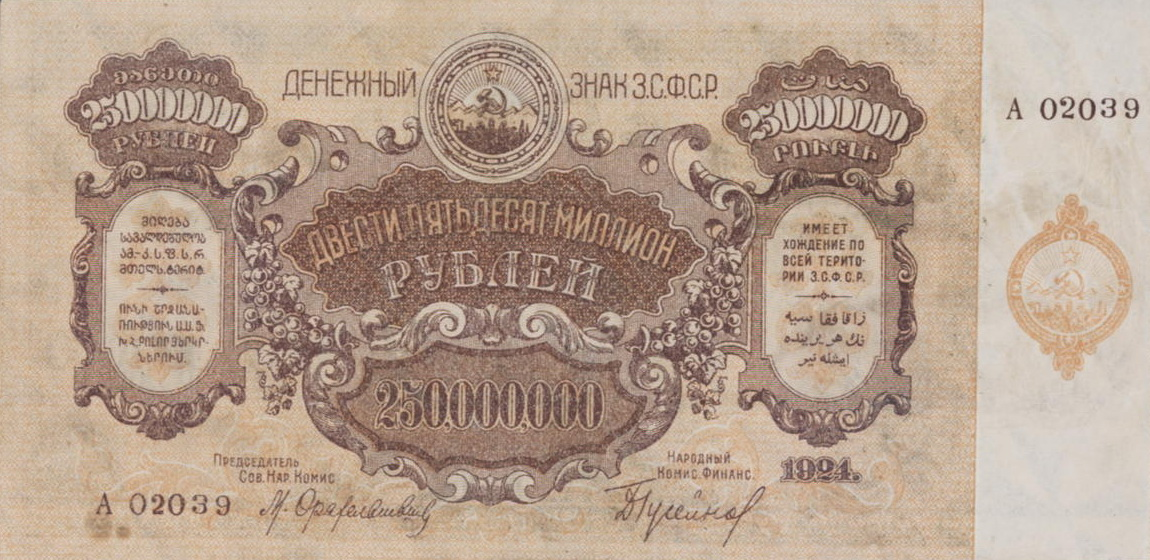
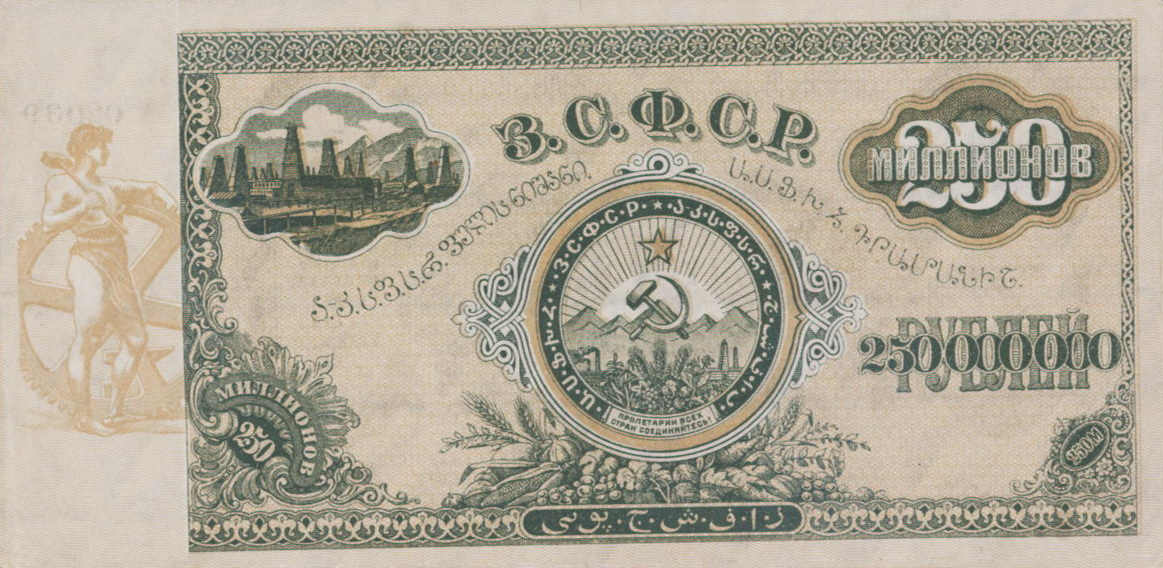
250 million rubles banknote of Transcaucasian SFSR

After three years of participation in World War I, the economy of the Russian empire was in crisis. In March 1917 the so-called February Revolution overthrew the regime of Tsar Nikolai II, which was replaced with a provisional government headed by a succession of leaders ending with Alexander Kerensky. The economy remained disrupted and Russia failed to disengage from the bloody European war, and on November 7, 1917 the Kerensky government fell in a second revolution, this time led by the Bolshevik Party of revolutionary socialist Vladimir Ulyanov (Lenin).

Civil war ensued and the economy of the new regime became even more chaotic. With mismanagement rampant and hunger sweeping the land, the value of the ruble, currency of the nation, essentially collapsed. During this interval, known as War Communism, money lost its function as a store of value and a means of exchange. A return was made by people in their daily lives to a primitive barter economy.

While use of the printing press to produce paper money was employed as virtually the sole means of state finance, manufacturing output simultaneously dropped precipitously, exacerbating the collapse of currency value. Unemployed and under-employed workers often took to the manufacture of small crafts items, often using stolen materials, to have something to trade for food during the economic crisis.

Throughout 1919 and into 1920 the wages of workers were paid largely in kind through the direct distribution of products. Scarce resources were distributed by ration and were generally free. Concurrently with this decline in the purchasing power and function of money, private trade was formally declared illegal and efforts made to nationalize all industries.

With the nation's currency in shambles, Soviet economic officials discussed implementation of a new monetary device to facilitate the exchange of products, such as "labor units," but the period of War Communism came to a close in 1921 before any such idea could be implemented.

The end of War Communism and the establishment of the New Economic Policy was based upon the legalization of petty trade and a replacement of the hated policy of forced requisitioning of grain production with fixed taxation rates. This presumed a return to a money-based economy and the stabilization of the Soviet currency became one of the primary tasks of the government's economic functionaries.

=== The first eight months ===
The first eight months after the Bolshevik Revolution of November 1917 are believed by some scholars of Soviet Russia to have marked a discrete interval in the economic history of the Soviet regime. Economics were bound with politics in this period, it is argued, with primary emphasis placed upon obtaining and maintaining political power. The nationalization of specific industries and institutions — such as banks, communications, and transport — should be seen at least in part through this prism, many believe.

Nationalization of industry was further seen as a necessary means to the Bolsheviks' self-proclaimed goal of establishment of a classless society. British Marxist economist Maurice Dobb observed:

"If the existence of a ruling capitalist class was rooted in ownership and the differential advantage which that ownership gave over the ownerless...it followed that the continued existence of capital in private hands represented a continuance of the capitalist class and its influence..."

Consequently, the Bolsheviks sought to expropriate major industry as an integral part of its program of overthrowing one class and replacing it with another, with an emphasis placed upon the nationalization of the largest scale industries held by the leading members of the capitalist class. The process, however, was slow and piecemeal, with only 100 firms nationalized by the central government and somewhat more than 400 by local authorities by July 1918.

=== War Communism (Summer 1918 to Spring 1921) ===
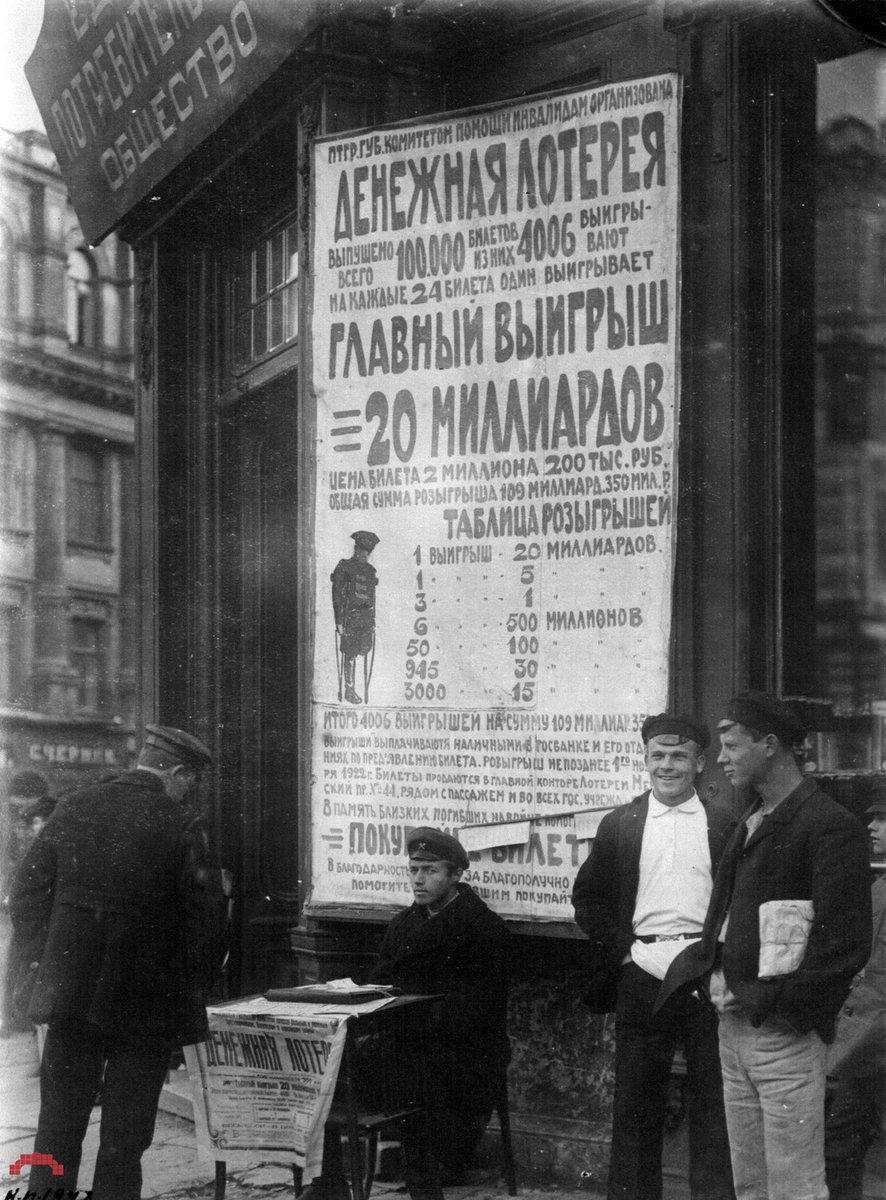
Lottery ads in Petrograd in 1921. The grand prize is 20 billion rubles

With the eruption of civil war on a large scale in the summer of 1918, the already grim economic situation in Soviet Russia deteriorated further. Full effort was placed upon military production and factories across the country fell silent for lack of raw materials. According to one estimate, that of P. Popov of the Central Statistical Bureau of Soviet Russia, by 1920 the total production of Russian industry had fallen from a pre-war level of 6.059 billion gold rubles to the equivalent of just 836 million — a decline of more than 85%.

Nationalization of industry proceeded at a frenetic rate, with an industrial survey of August 1920 indicating that some 37,000 firms had been expropriated by the state — including more than 5,000 which employed only one person. The Supreme Council of National Economy (Vesenkha), chief economic control agency of Soviet Russia in this period, cited a far lower figure of 4,420 nationalized enterprises in November 1920, while a third source indicated a total of 4,547 firms under state ownership. That authoritative sources disagree so wildly is indicative of the ad hoc nature of the nationalization process.

As the War Communism period progressed manufactured consumer goods came to be in such short supply that they were virtually unobtainable. Peasants refused to sell their surplus products for money which could effectively buy nothing. Facing starvation in the cities and the death of industry as peasant-workers returned to their villages, the Soviet state resorted to the use of force to obtain necessary grain to maintain its urban economy. This resort to forced requisitioning had the effect of further decimating agricultural production, already seriously weakened by the loss of millions of able-bodied peasant men to the front. Wherever requisitioning was applied, the area of land dedicated to cultivation contracted.

In the words of one economic historian, "The only industry which thrived was that concerned with the production of paper money." The amount of currency in circulation from the beginning to the end of 1920, rose from about 225 billion fiat rubles to 1.17 trillion. This represented a 25-fold increase over the amount of paper money in circulation in 1917.

With the virtual collapse of money economy in favor of requisition, rationing, and barter, came a virtual abolition of banking in Soviet Russia. With productive industry almost completely state-owned, the People's Bank (successor to the pre-revolutionary State Bank) had no credit function; rather, it acted as a clearinghouse for transmission of assets to industry, with funds primarily obtained through currency emission.

The People's Bank was abolished altogether in January 1920, with the issuance of currency transferred to the People's Commissariat of Finance (Narkomfin). The decree shutting down the People's Bank made provision for continued use of the offices of Narkomfin for private finance on a limited and seemingly temporary basis:

"The nationalization of industry has concentrated in the hands of the government all the most important branches of production and supply...thereby excluding any necessity for the further utilization of the People's Bank as an institution of state credit in the accepted sense of the term. The system of banking credit still remains in force for small private industrial enterprise and the needs of individual citizens who place their money in state savings institutions. Nevertheless, as these transactions are gradually losing their importance in the economic life of the country, the existence of separate banking institutions is no longer necessary. Such transactions are now of secondary importance, and may be successfully carried out by the central and local institutions of the Commissariat of Finance..."

It was neither Marxist theory that was causing disintegration of the money economy nor the replacement of currency transactions by moneyless credits between state-owned firms, but rather hyperinflation. The ruble had collapsed as a store of value and a medium of exchange, but nothing had been created to replace it.

=== Coming of the NEP period (Spring 1921) ===
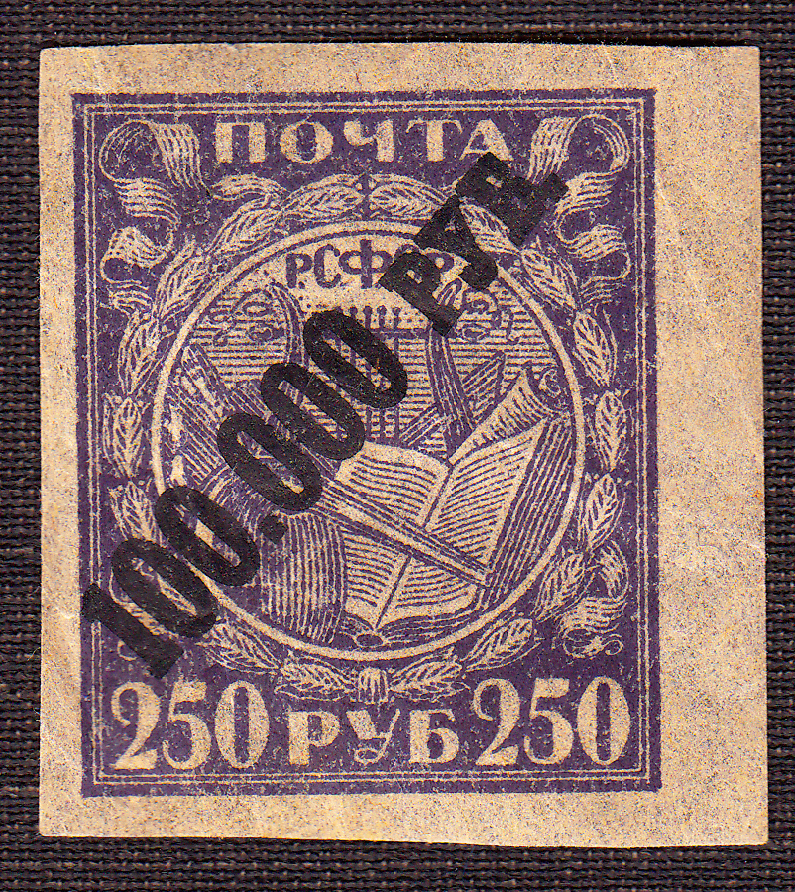
The crashing value of the Soviet ruble in 1922 moved the government to revalue these 250 ruble postage stamps with a 100,000 ruble overprint.

Faced with economic collapse and widespread peasant revolt, in the spring of 1921 the Soviet government changed course towards a return to market-based relations between the state and the peasantry with the adoption of the New Economic Policy (NEP). No more would forced requisitioning be the order of the day, but rather the adoption of a regularized "tax-in-kind." Part and parcel of NEP would be a return to a functional currency and monetary payment of wages rather than compensation of workers through rations and free services, as was the case under War Communism. House rents, previously free, were charged by the state and social services were placed on a self-funding basis akin to insurance.

The People's Commissariat of Finance (Narkomfin) emerged as the leading bureaucratic agency seeking currency stabilization. With the value of the Soviet ruble plummeting precipitously from week to week, this chief financial and budgeting agency needed a mechanism for the calculation of wages of Soviet workers, which from the fall of 1921 were calculated in money rather than in-kind commodities. As a result, a new theoretical concept was created by Narkomfin called the "goods ruble" or "pre-war ruble" — based upon the purchasing power of the Tsarist ruble in 1913, before the distortion of the Russian economy caused by the nation's descent into World War I. From November 1921 onward Narkomfin pegged the value of the Soviet ruble in terms of this theoretical unit each month, allowing wages to be automatically adjusted to compensate for the steadily depreciating currency.

In March 1922 Narkomfin abandoned the so-called goods ruble for a new unit of measurement, the gold ruble — a new parallel official state currency redeemable in gold. The plummeting Soviet ruble would be henceforth equated to the gold ruble through on-the-fly estimation of the purchasing power of each. Adding to the complexity of the situation, the State Planning Committee (Gosplan) continued to make use of a pre-war "goods ruble" of its own creation, using it as a payment calculation mechanism in many Soviet contracts.

As the value of the Soviet ruble crashed, the process of price calculation and wage payment remained chaotic, as historian E. H. Carr later observed, with Soviet workers frequently bearing the brunt of the exchange problem:

"The resulting situation was extremely complex. To fix current wage rates from month to month in terms of the goods ruble price-index was a matter of expert computation. To fix the rate of exchange between the goods ruble and the Soviet ruble in which payment would actually be made to the worker involved another delicate and highly controversial calculation, in the course of which many devices were employed to force down real wages below the rates agreed on and ostensibly paid.... The absence of a wages policy combined with rivalry between departments to produce almost inextricable confusion."

== Exchange rate for sterling in contemporary Soviet rubles ==
In 1914, before the war, the British gold sovereign coin was valued at 9.50 rubles. The ruble depreciated to 16 per pound in 1916.

Below is a table for the price of a British gold sovereign coin in fiat rubles in different time periods.

Date	Value of £1 sterling in rubles
1918 — Quarter I	45
1918 — Quarter II	60
1918 — Quarter III	80
1918 — Quarter IV	150
1919 — Quarter I	400
1919 — Quarter II	900
1919 — Quarter III	1,200
1919 — Quarter IV	3,000
1920 — Quarter I	6,000
1920 — Quarter II	10,000
1922 — Quarter I	1,650,000
1922 — Quarter II	14,900,000
1922 — Quarter III	18,650,000
1922 — Quarter IV	71,730,000
1923 — Quarter I	192,080,000
1923 — Quarter II	385,000,000
1923 — Quarter III	866,000,000
1923 — Quarter IV	5,040,000,000

Sources: 1918-1920: M. Feitelberg, Das Papiergeldwesen in Räte-Russland. (Berlin: 1920), pg. 50. Cited in S.S. Katzenellenbaum, Russian Currency and Banking. London: P.S. King & Son, 1925; pg. 83. Note that during this interval the purchasing power of the pound also fell substantially so that this decline in ruble value is understated. 1922-1923: S.S. Katzenellenbaum, Russian Currency and Banking. London: P.S. King & Son, 1925; pg. 90. Price is average Moscow free market price for first month of each specified quarter.

== Money supply ==
Amounts are in billions of rubles. Circulating supply quoted at end of period for each year.

Year	Amount issued	Circulating supply	Percentage increase
1915	2.7	5.6	90.6%
1916	3.5	9.1	61.2%
1917	16.4	27.3	180.3%
1918	33.5	60.8	119.2%
1919	164.2	225.0	302.5%
1920	943.6	1,168.6	419.3%
1921	16,375.3	17,543.9	1402.0%
1922	1,976,900	1,994,500	11,268.2%
1923	176,505,500	178,510,000	8,849.6%

Source: S.S. Katzenellenbaum, Russian Currency and Banking. London: P.S. King & Son, 1925; pg. 59.

== See also ==
- Hyperinflation in the Weimar Republic
- Monetary reform in the Soviet Union, 1922–24
- Soviet ruble
