= Krajina dinar =

Currency of the Republic of Serbian Krajina

Динар Републике Српске Крајине (Serbian); Dinar Republike Srpske Krajine (Serbian)
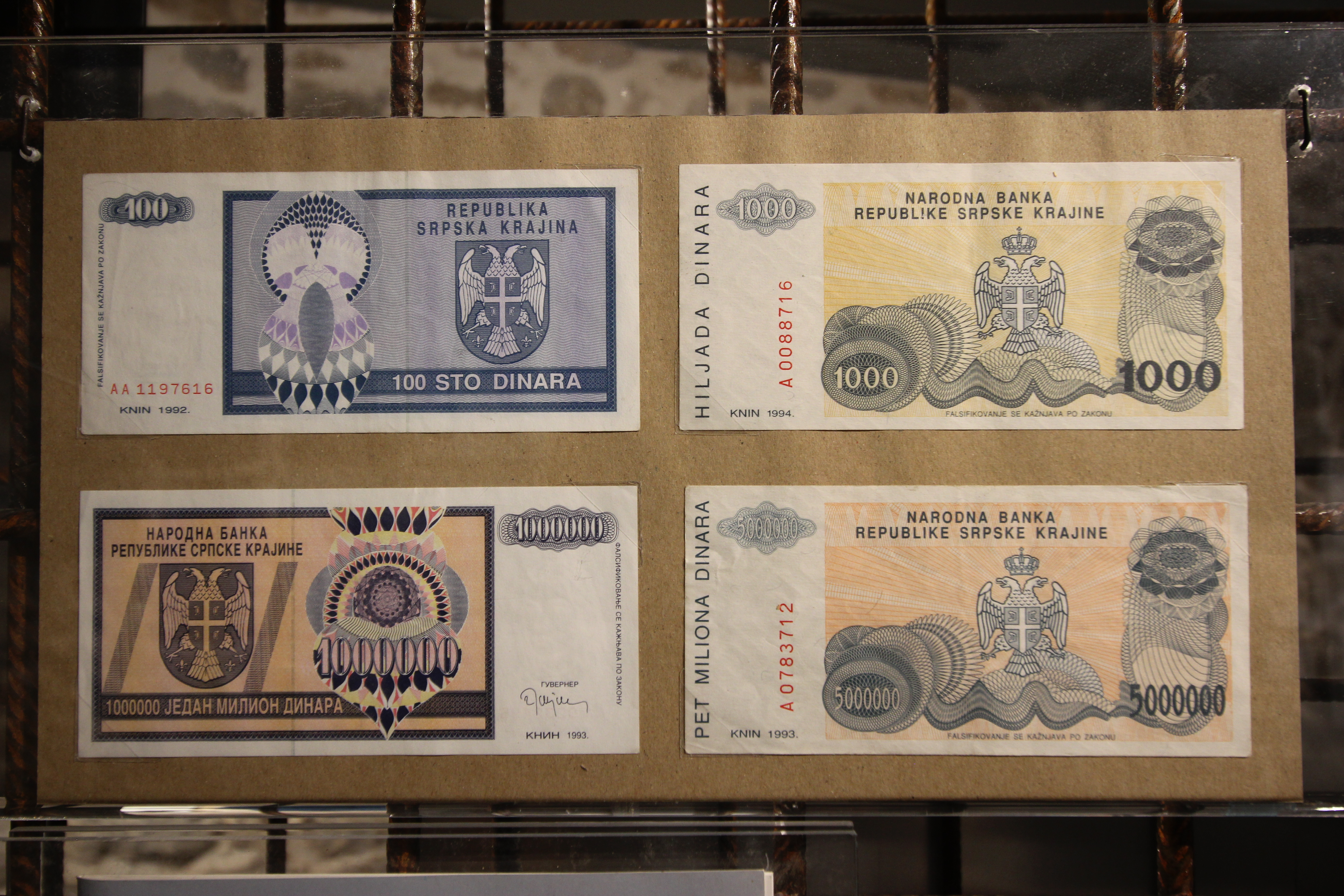

ISO 4217
- Code: None

Denominations
- Banknotes: 1000, 10,000, 500,000, 1 million, 10 million dinars.
- Coins: None

Demographics
- Replaced: Yugoslav dinar
- Replaced by: Croatian kuna
- User(s): Republic of Serbian Krajina

Issuance
- Central bank: National Bank of Republic of Serbian Krajina
- This infobox shows the latest status before this currency was rendered obsolete.

The Krajina dinar (Serbian: динар Републике Српске Крајине, romanized: dinar Republike Srpske Krajine) was the currency of the Republic of Serbian Krajina between 1992 and 1994.

== History ==
There were three distinct dinars. The first was introduced on 20 July 1992 in parallel with the new Yugoslav dinar of that year, to which it was equal. The second dinar replaced the first at a rate of 1 million to one on 1 October 1993, whilst the third replaced the second at a rate of 1 billion (10^{9}) to one on 1 January 1994. In 1995, Croatia took control of the region and the Croatian kuna became the currency. No coins were issued for any of the three dinara.

== Banknotes ==
In 1991, three uniface war loan certificates denominated in 10,000, 20,000, and 50,000 динара (dinara) were prepared, but never issued. Although these resemble banknotes, they are not banknotes. These were followed, on 20 July 1992, by regular type notes for 10, 50, 100, 500, 1000 and 5000 dinars. Later in 1992, notes were issued by the Narodna Banka Republike Srpske Krajine (National Bank of Republic of Srpska Krajina) in denominations of 10,000 and 50,000 dinars. These were followed by notes for 100,000, 1 million, 5 million, 10 million, 20 million, 50 million, 100 million, 500 million, 1 billion, 5 billion and 10 billion dinars. When the second dinars was introduced later on 1 October 1993, notes were issued in denominations of 5000, 50,000, 100,000, 500,000, 5 million, 100 million, 500 million, 5 billion, 10 billion and 50 billion. On 1 January 1994, the third dinar was issued in denominations of 1000, 10,000, 500,000, 1 million and 10 million dinars.

== Abolishment ==
On 15 February 1994, the "Protocol on the establishment of a single monetary system in the territory of the FR Yugoslavia, Republika Srpska and RSK" and the "Decree on the new dinar" was signed so that the Yugoslav dinar would replace the Krajina dinar and Republika Srpska dinar entirely.

== See also ==
- Yugoslav dinar
- Economy of Republic of Serbian Krajina
- Republika Srpska dinar
- Croatian dinar
- Bosnia and Herzegovina dinar
- Hyperinflation
