= Bosnia and Herzegovina dinar =

Currency of the Republic of Bosnia and Herzegovina

bosanskohercegovački dinar (Serbo-Croatian); босанскохерцеговачки динар (Serbo-Croatian)

ISO 4217
- Code: BAD

Unit
- Plural: The language(s) of this currency belong(s) to the Slavic languages. There is more than one way to construct plural forms.
- Symbol: BAD

Denominations
- Subunit
- 1/100: para / пара
- Banknotes: 10, 20, 25, 50, 100, 500, 1000, 100000 dinara
- Coins: none

Demographics
- Replaced: Yugoslav dinar
- Replaced by: Bosnia and Herzegovina convertible mark
- User(s): None, previously: Republic of Bosnia and Herzegovina; Croatian Republic of Herzeg-Bosnia; Autonomous Province of Western Bosnia

Issuance
- Central bank: Central Bank of Bosnia Herzegovina
- Website: www.cbbh.ba

Valuation
- Pegged with: Deutsche Mark = 100 dinars
- This infobox shows the latest status before this currency was rendered obsolete.

The Bosnia and Herzegovina dinar (Serbo-Croatian: bosanskohercegovački dinar / босанскохерцеговачки динар) was the independent currency of Republic of Bosnia and Herzegovina between 1992 and 1998.

== History ==
The Republic of Bosnia and Herzegovina declared independence from SFR Yugoslavia in March 1992. The first Bosnian dinar was issued in July 1992, replacing the 1990 version of the Yugoslav dinar at the rate of 1 Bosnia dinar = 10 Yugoslav. Consequently, the Bosnian dinar was at par with the 1992 version of the Yugoslav dinar when it was introduced.

The first issues were overprinted on Yugoslav banknotes. In November 1992, 10 dinar banknotes were overprinted with denominations of 100,000 dinars. After suffering from high inflation, a second dinar was introduced in August 1994, replacing the first at a rate of 1 "new" dinar = 10,000 "old" dinara. Both these dinars were restricted in their circulation to the areas under Bosniak control. The Croat areas used the Croatian dinar and kuna, whilst the Serb areas used the Republika Srpska dinar.

Along with the Croatian dinar and Yugoslav dinar, the Bosnia and Herzegovina dinar was unstable, while the Croatian kuna was considered stable. The convertible mark replaced the dinar in 1998. As the name indicated, the mark was convertible into the Deutsche Mark until the latter was replaced by the euro in 2002.

== See also ==
- Dinar
- Yugoslav dinar
- Croatian dinar
- Republika Srpska dinar
