= Moldovan cupon =

Temporary currency of Moldova, 1992–1993

сupon moldovenesc (Romanian)
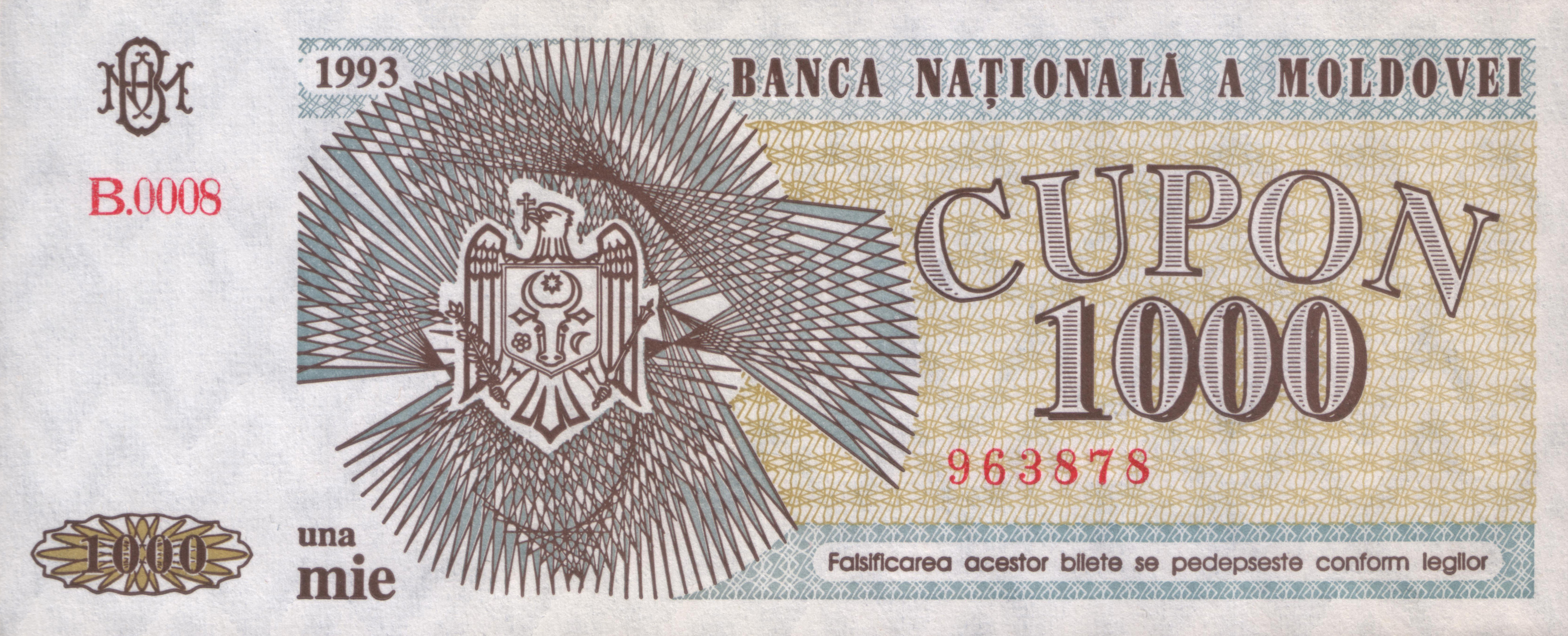
- 1,000 cupon banknote

Unit
- Plural: cupoane

Denominations
- Banknotes: 50, 200, 1,000, and 5,000 cupoane

Demographics
- Date of introduction: 1992
- Date of withdrawal: 1993
- Replaced by: Moldovan leu
- User(s): Moldova

Issuance
- Central bank: National Bank of Moldova
- Website: www.bnm.md
- This infobox shows the latest status before this currency was rendered obsolete.

The cupon was the temporary currency of Moldova between 1992 and 1993. It replaced the Soviet rouble at par and was replaced by the leu at a rate of 1 leu = 1,000 cupoane. Notes issued included 50, 200, 1,000, and 5,000 cupoane. It was issued only in paper form.

== Gallery ==
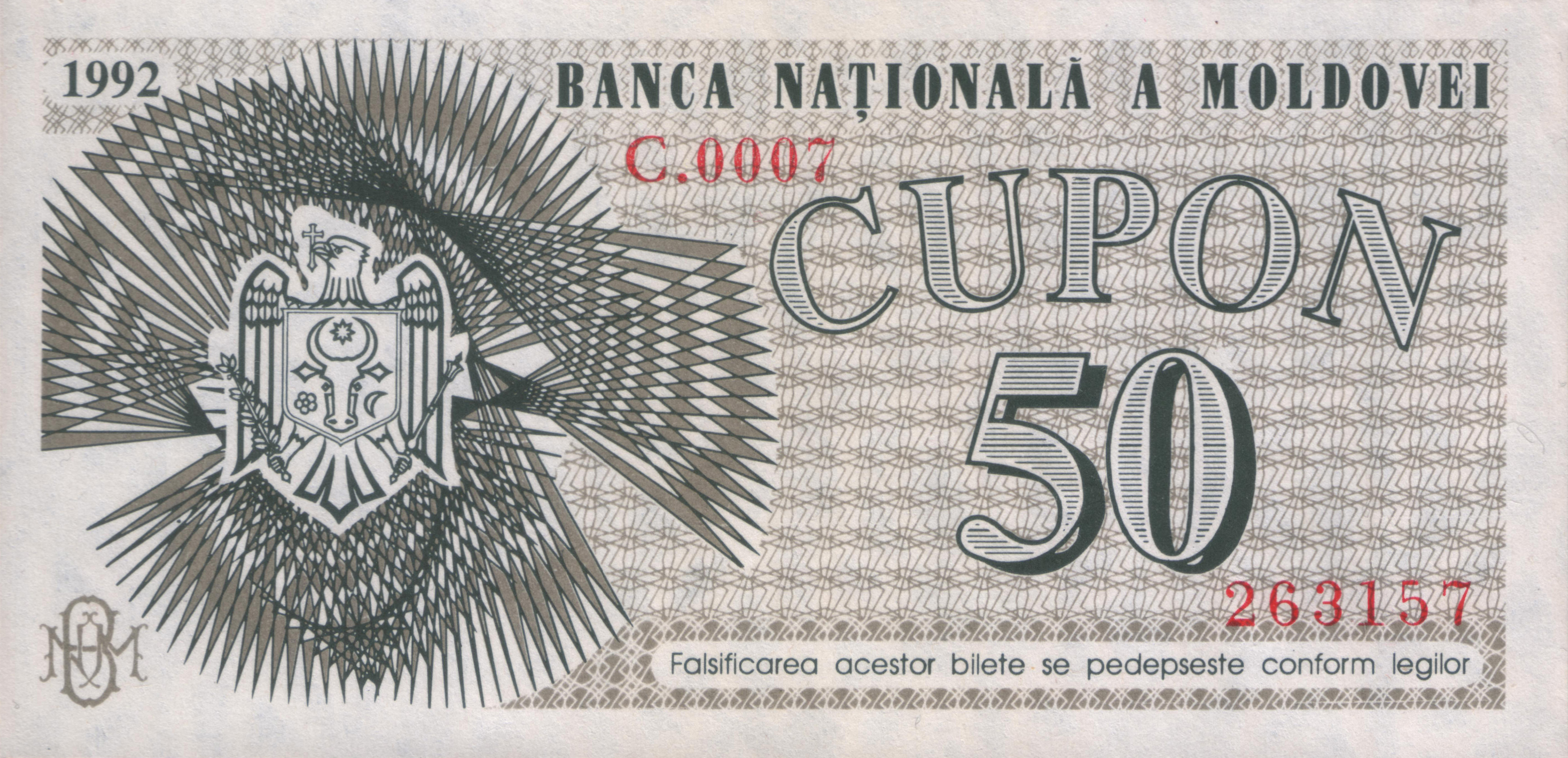
50 cupons

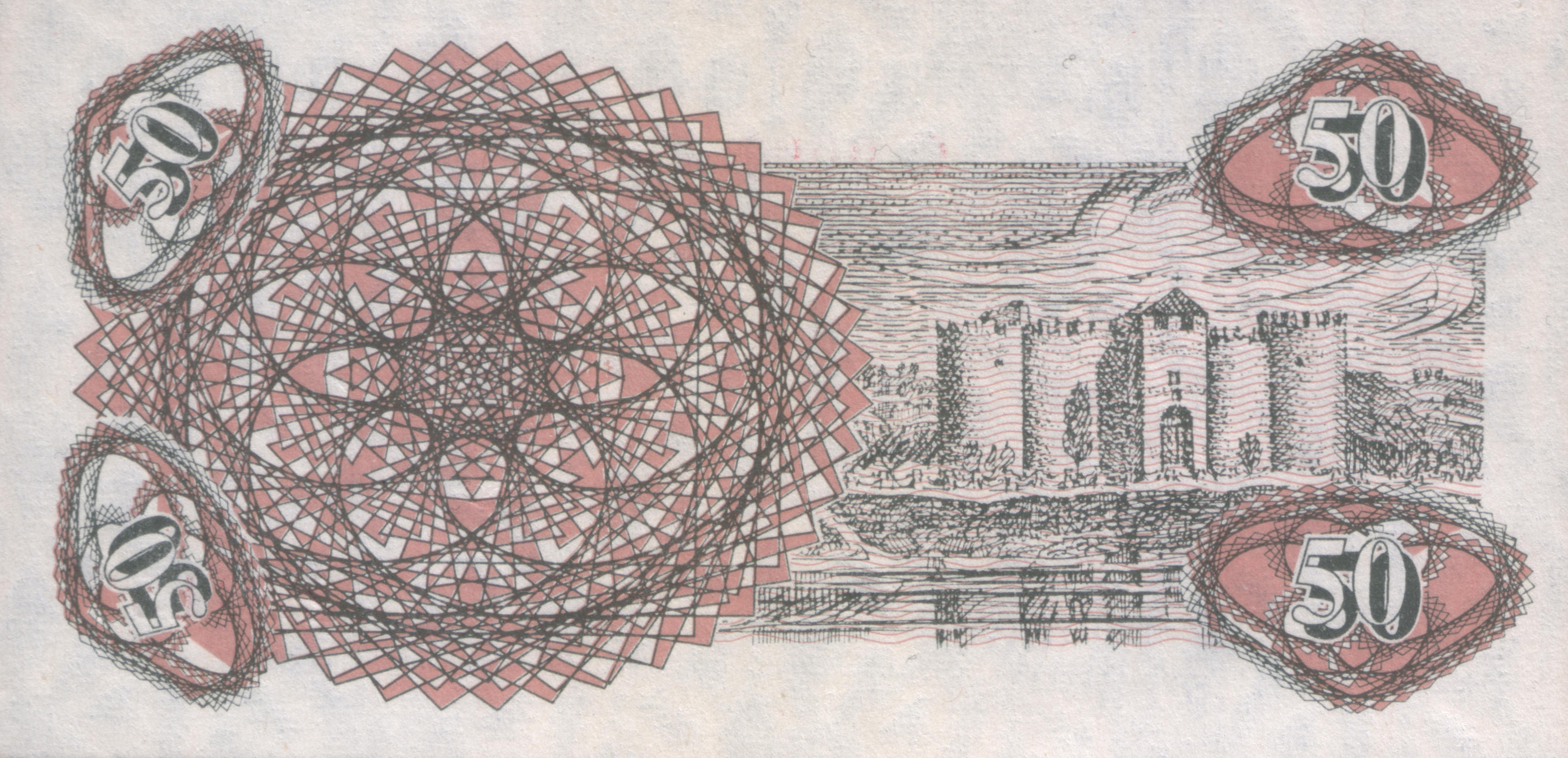
50 cupons

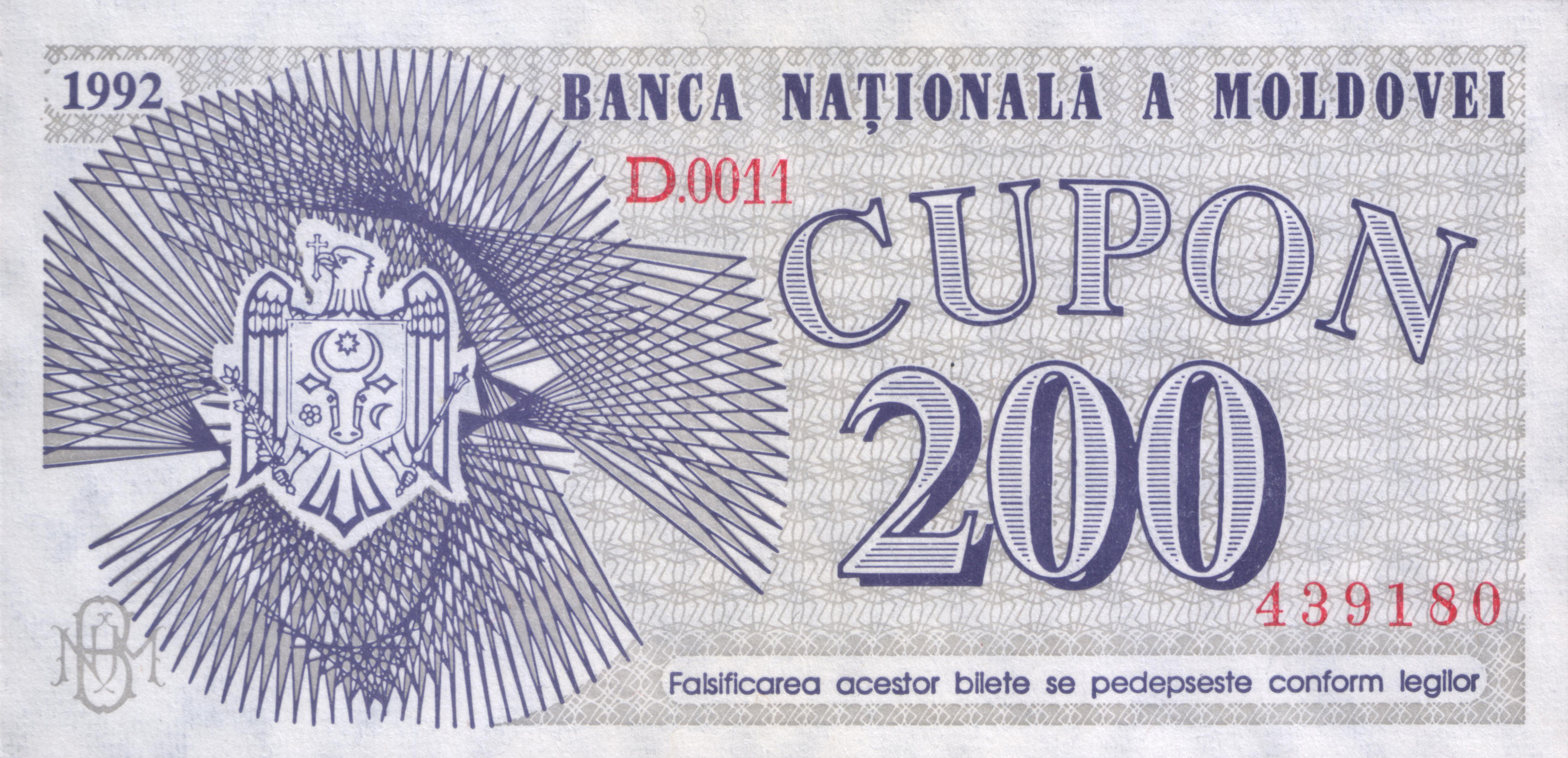
200 cupons

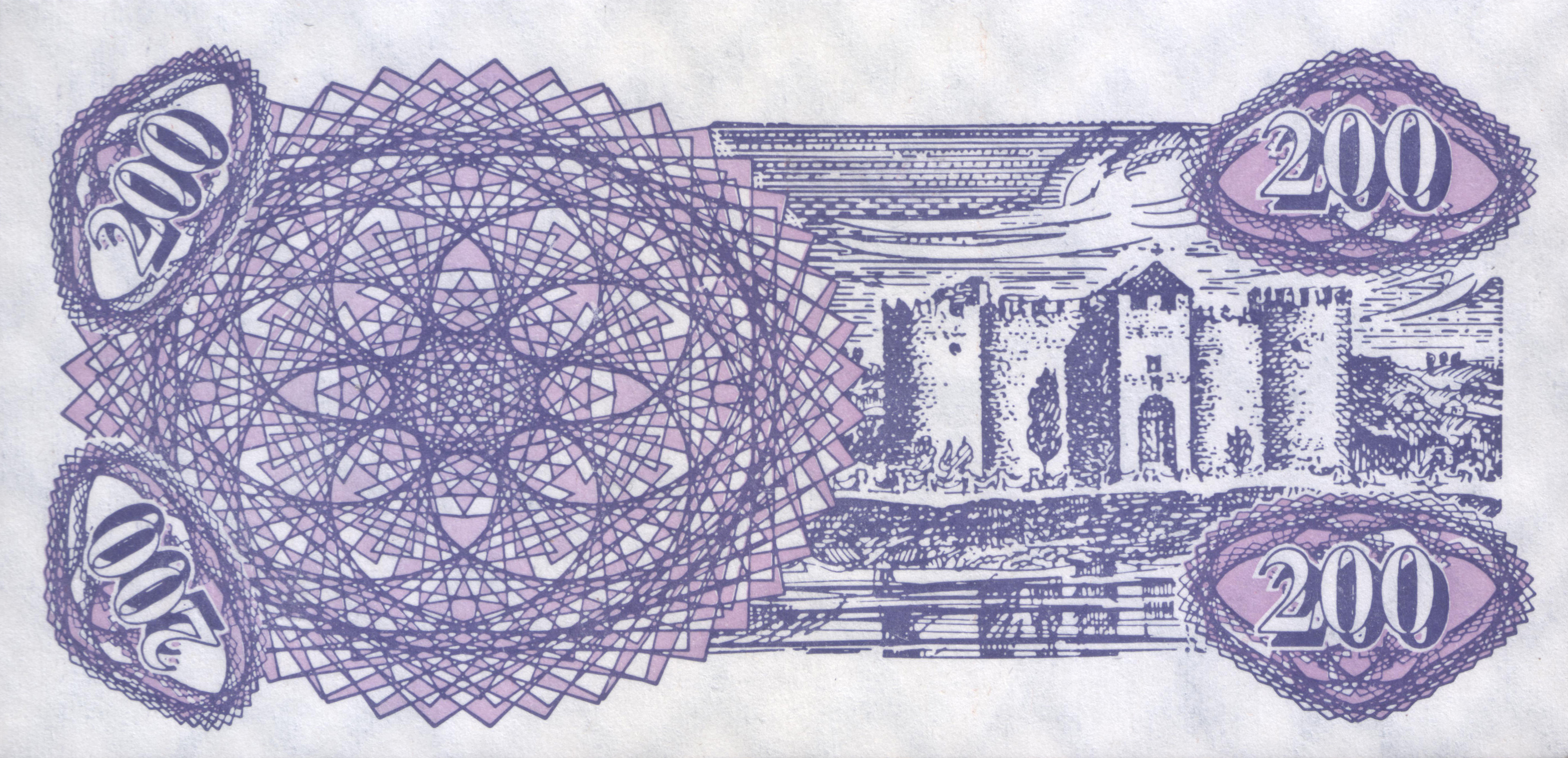
200 cupons

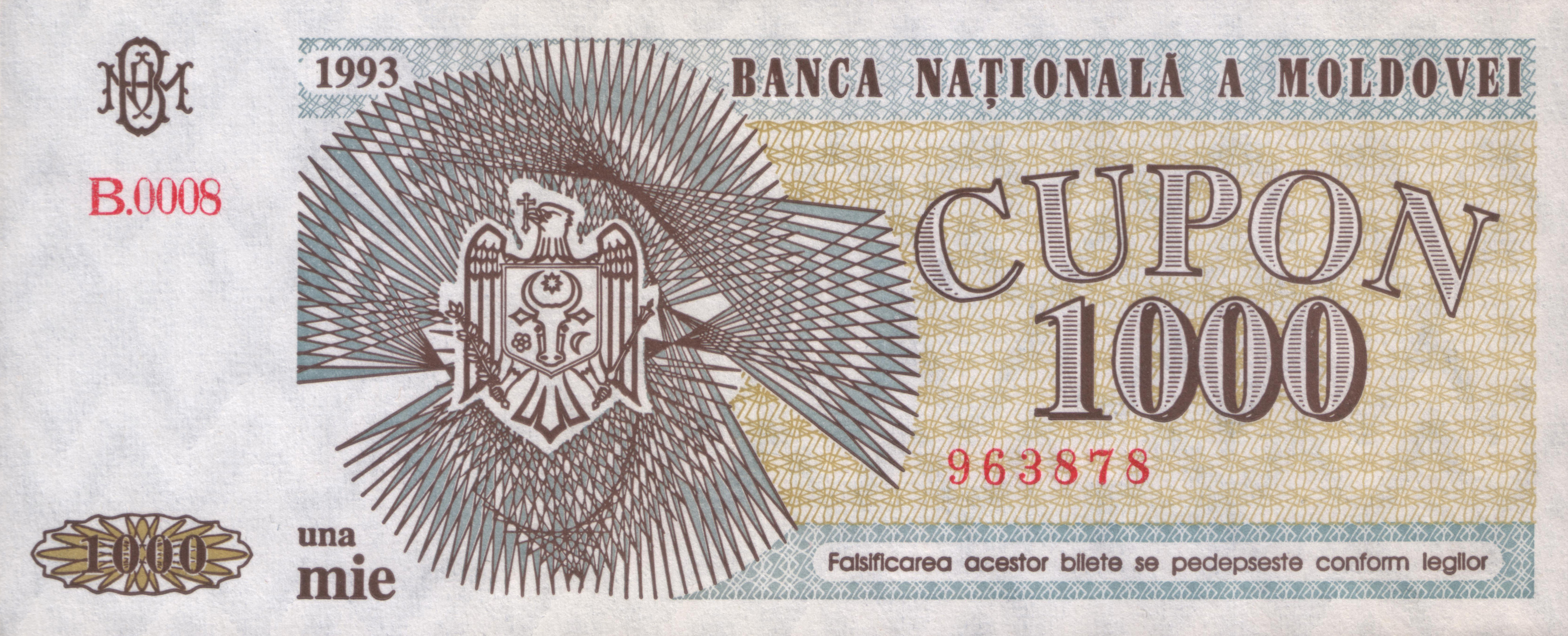
1,000 cupons

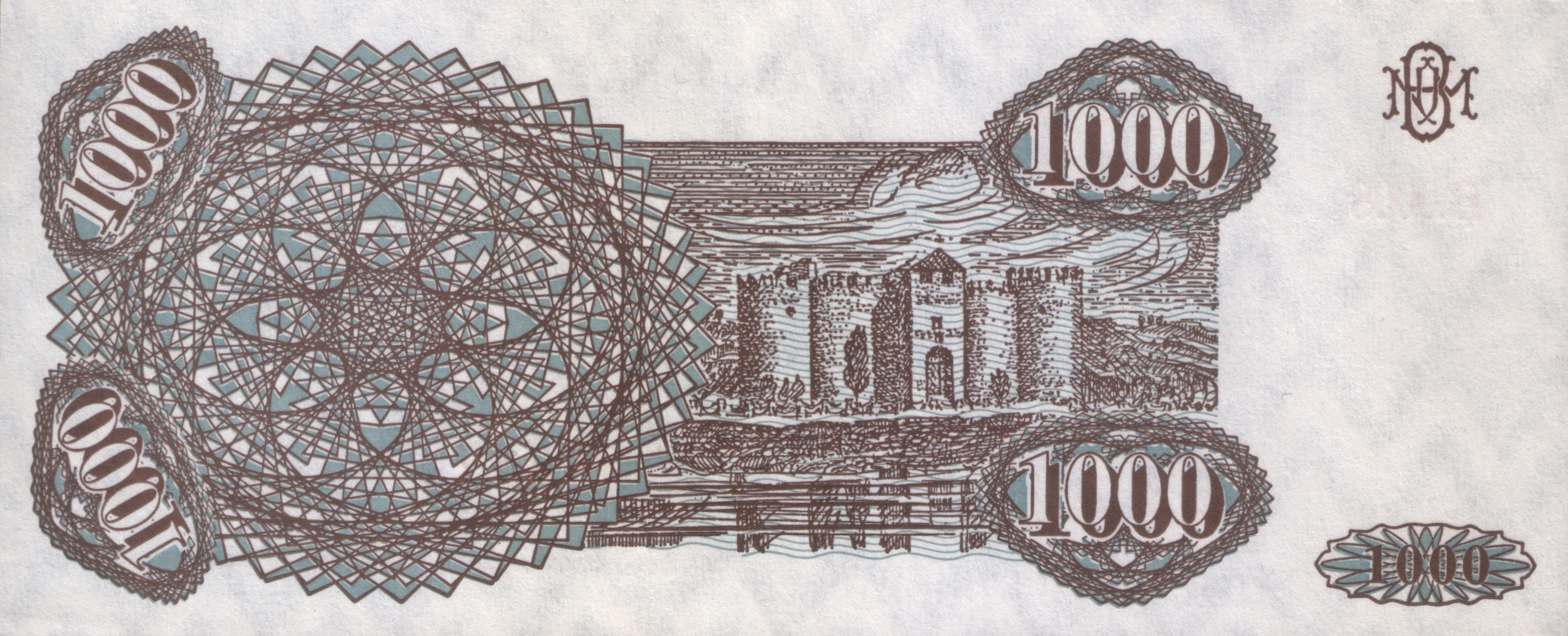
1,000 cupons

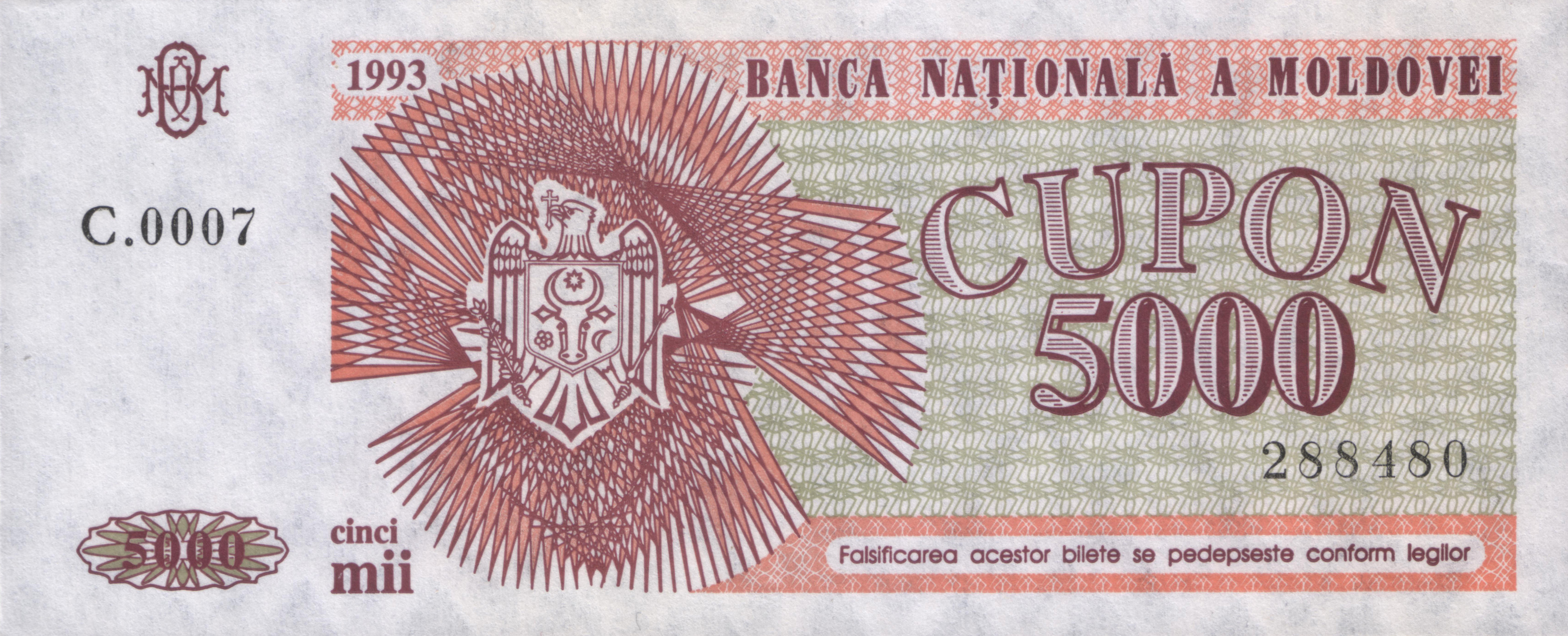
5,000 cupons

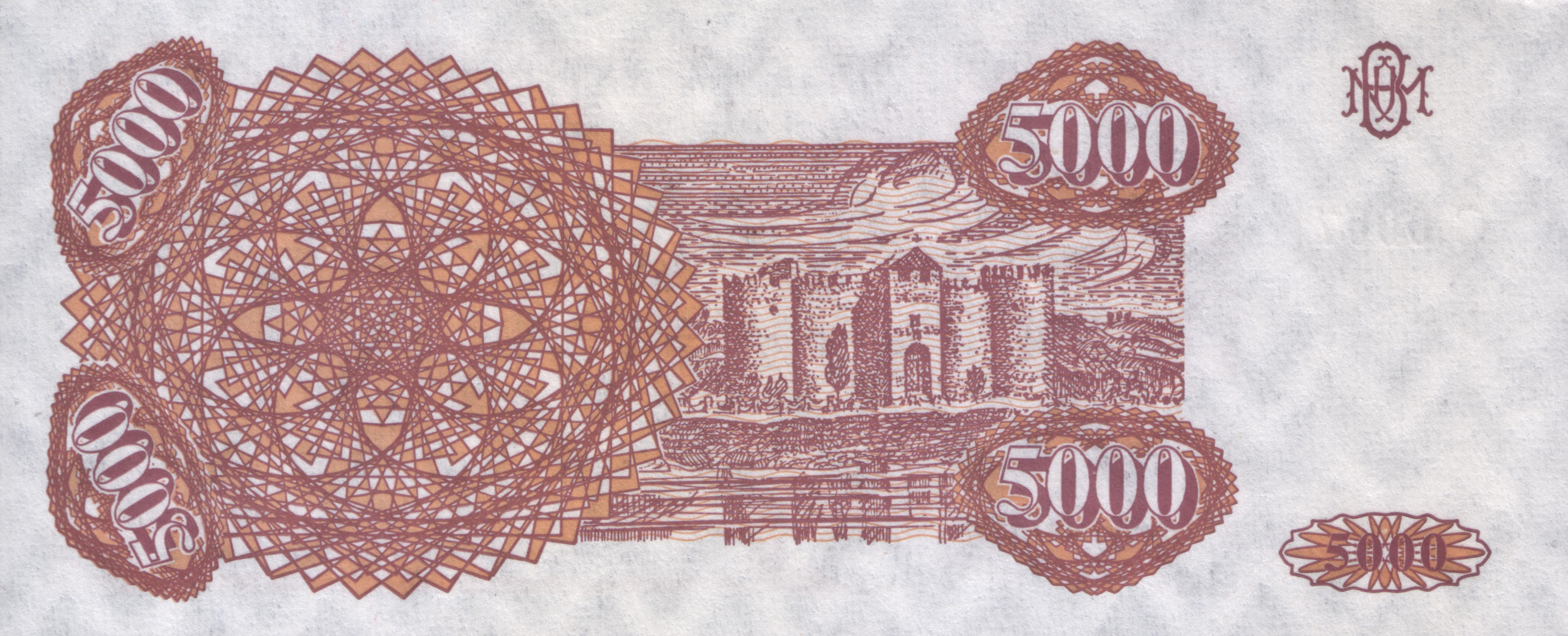
5,000 cupons

== See also ==
Preceded by: Soviet rouble Reason: independence from the USSR	Currency of Moldova; 1992 – 1993	Succeeded by: Moldovan leu Ratio: 1 leu = 1,000 cupons
