= Currency of Uruguay =

This is an outline of Uruguay's monetary history. For the present currency of Uruguay, see Uruguayan peso.

Uruguay private banknotes from the Peso and Doblón and Peso issuing periods.

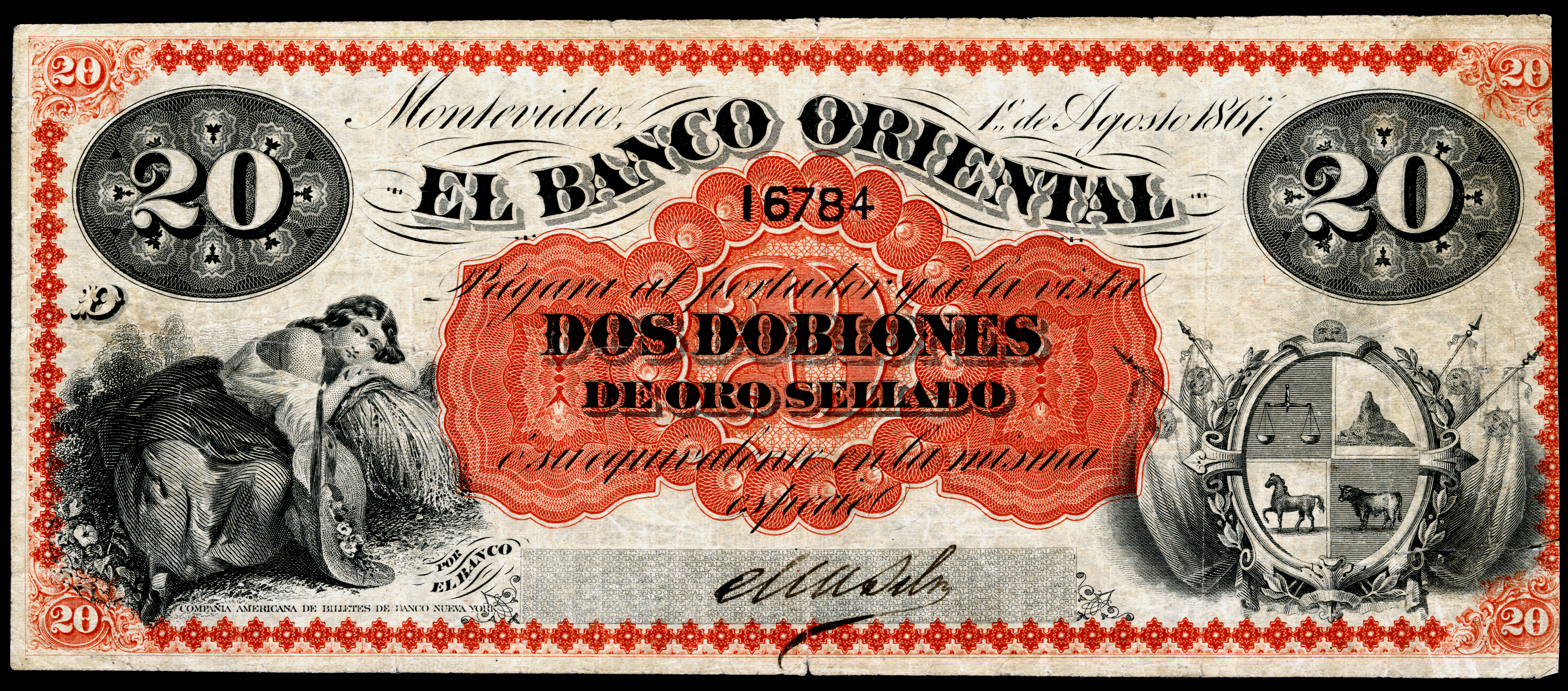
20 Pesos, Banco Oriental (1867)

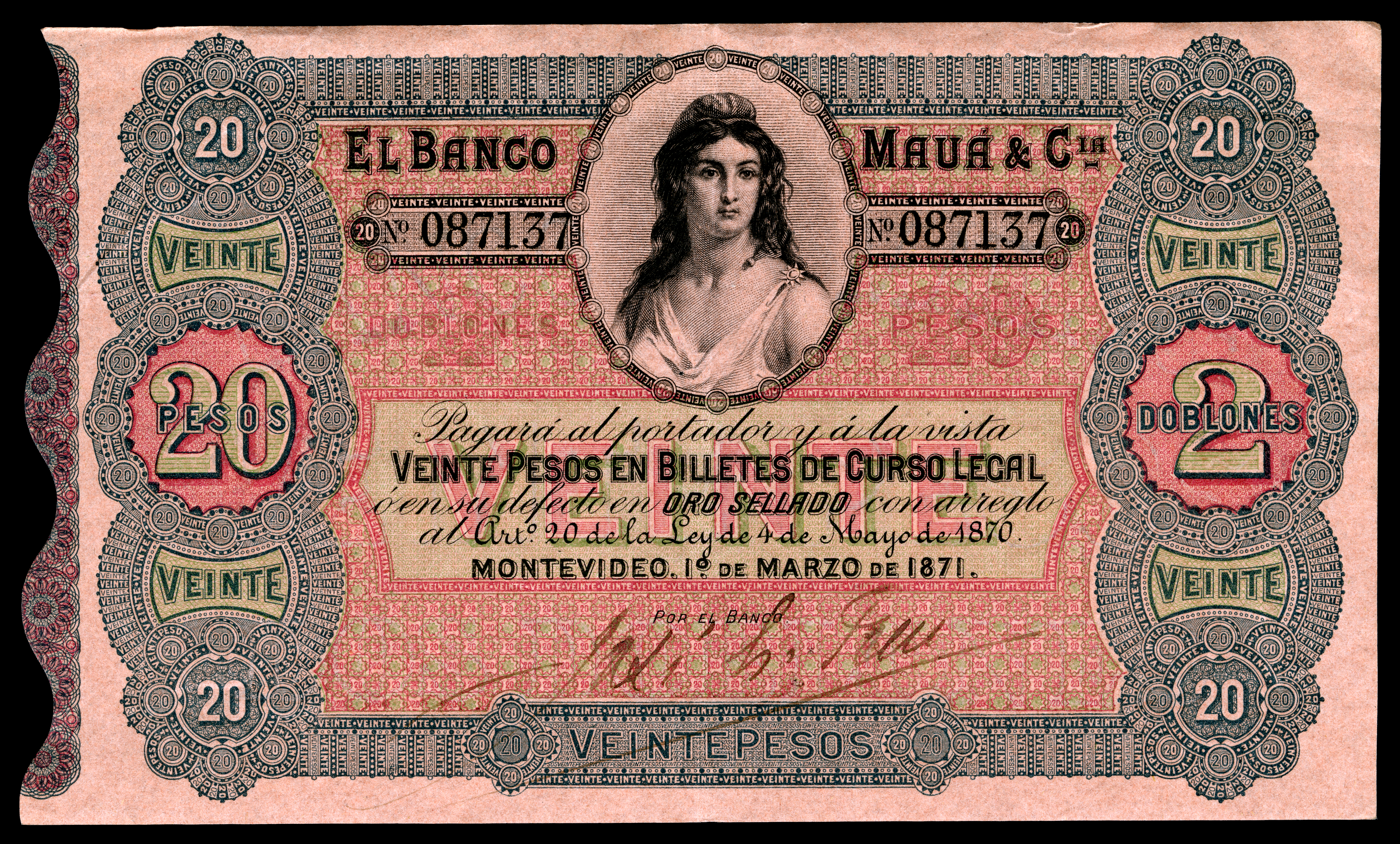
20 Pesos (or 2 gold doubloons), Banco Maua & Co. (1871)

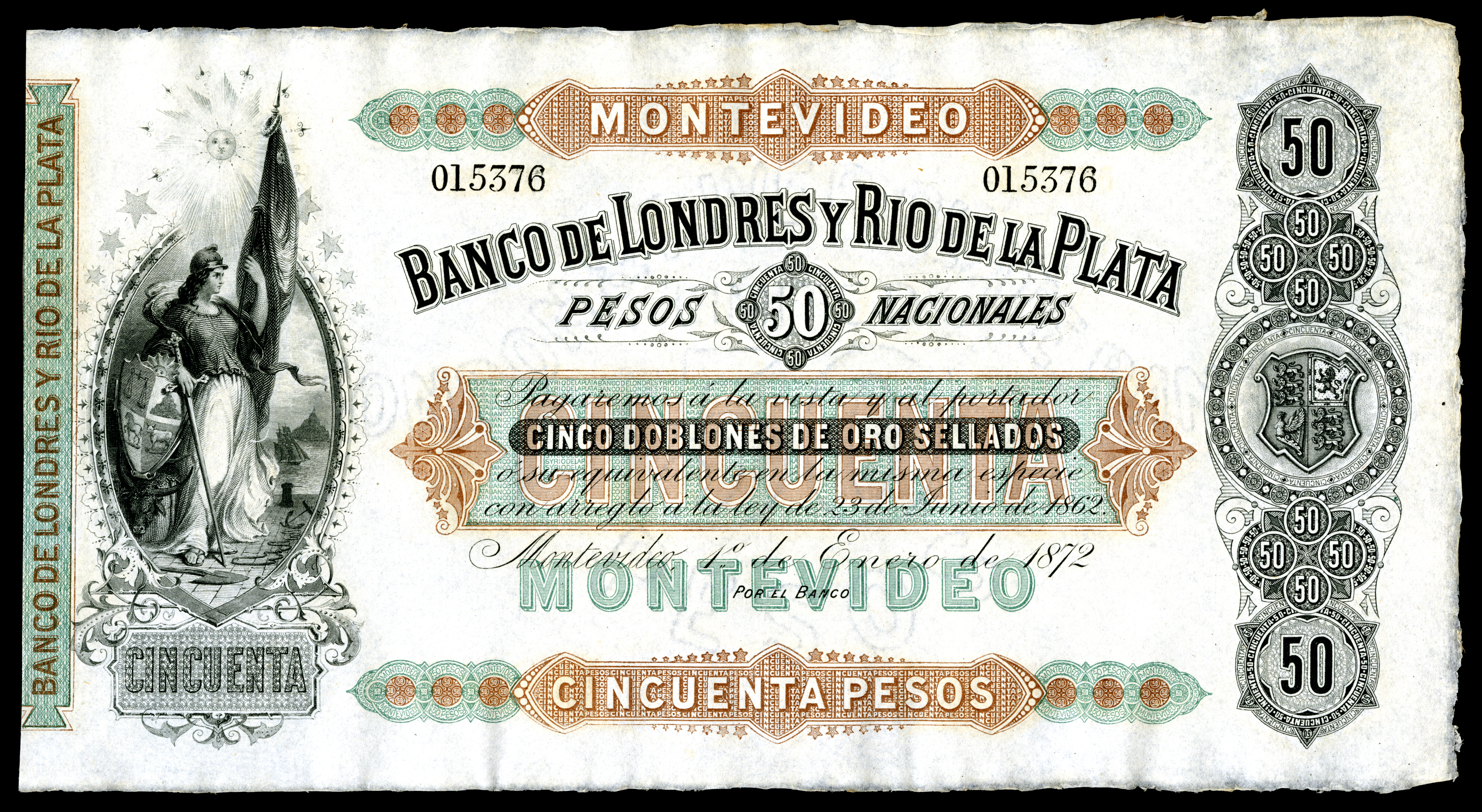
50 Pesos (or 5 gold doubloons), Banco Londres y Rio de la Plata (1872)

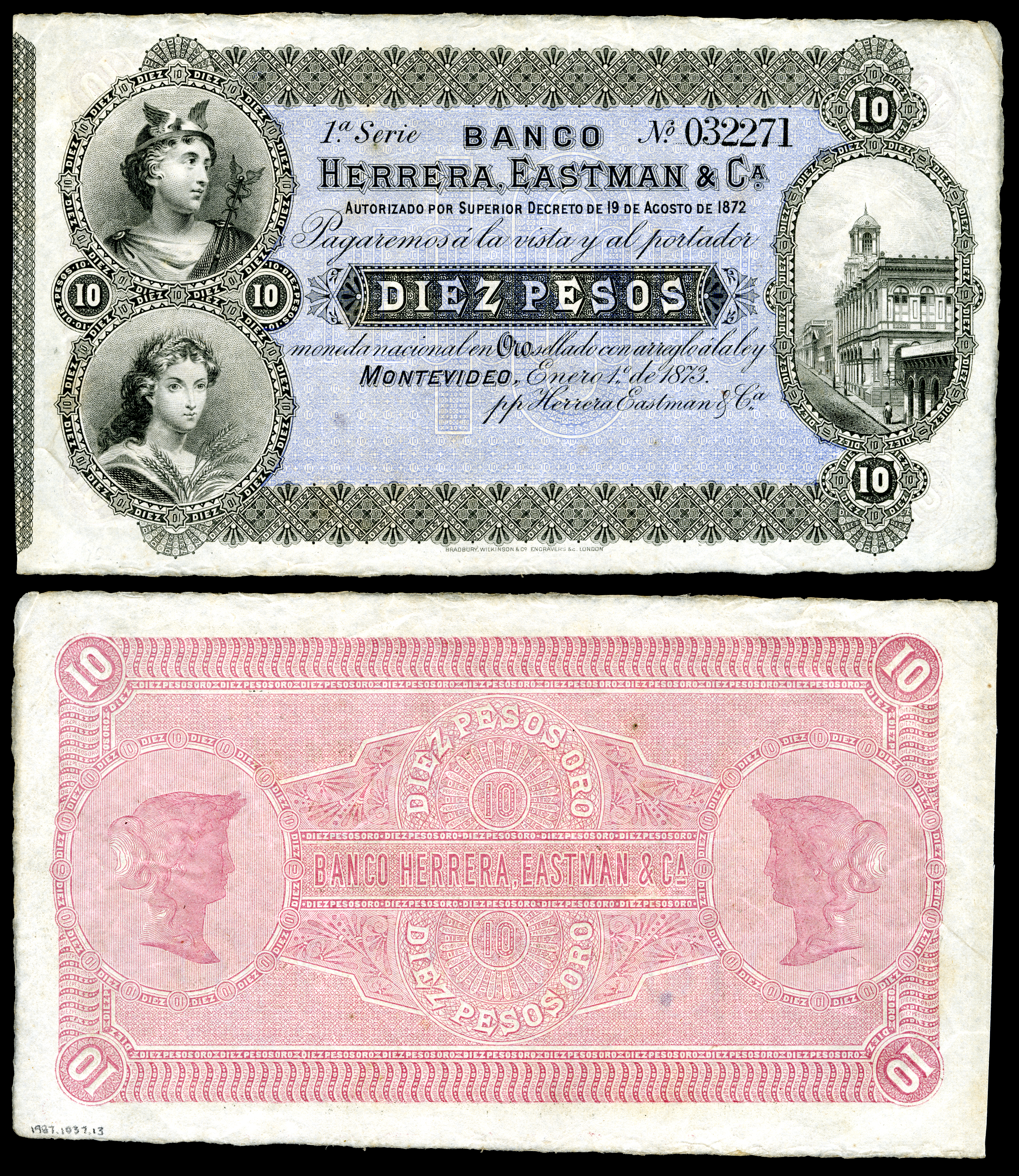
10 Pesos, Banco Herrera, Eastman & Co. (1873) (Note: Herrera, Eastman y Ca issued only 10 peso notes in one 1873 printing. These are considered very rare.)

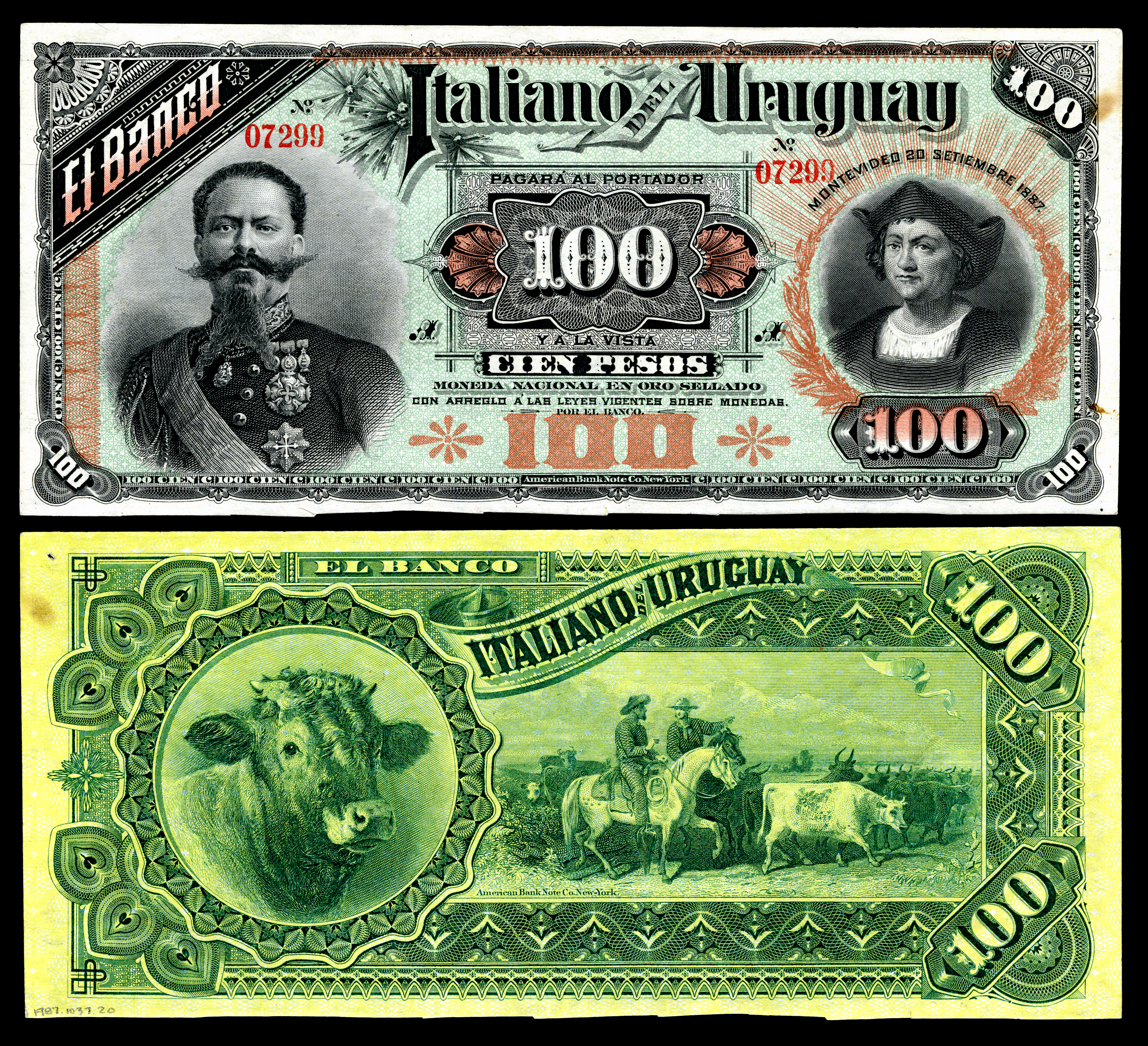
100 Pesos, Banco Italiano (1887)

== Pre-independence currency ==
Uruguay's currency was initially that common to all of Spanish America. During the struggle over this region, initially between Spain and Portugal, then between Argentina and Brazil, the coinage of both contestants circulated. When the area was annexed to Brazil in 1821 as Provincia Cisplatina, the Portuguese (Brazilian) administration put notes of Banco do Brazil into circulation. This was the first paper money to circulate in Uruguay. Then, in 1826–1828, Argentine troops fighting against Brazil were paid in one-peso notes issued by Banco Nacional of Buenos Aires for Provincia Oriental ("Eastern Province", i.e., Uruguay).

All parties to the conflict used the Spanish dollar (Spanish peso, Portuguese patacão), which circulated with a value of 8 Spanish reales or 960 Brazilian reis. Circulation consisted of coins from mints in Mexico, Potosí, Brazil, and Buenos Aires. During the turbulent period of conflict preceding independence, a considerable amount of poor-quality copper coin from both Buenos Aires and Brazil came into circulation.

== 1828–1854 Peso ==
Peso (Patacón) = 8 Reales = 800 Centésimos de real (centavos)

Onza de oro = 16 Pesos

=== History ===
In 1828, Uruguay's currency was based on the silver peso ($) of eight reales (R or r), commonly known as the patacón, and the gold onza de oro, valued at 16 pesos silver. But a large quantity of debased copper coin also circulated. Lacking the means to implement a national coinage, Gen. José Rondeau's provisional government permitted foreign silver and gold coin to circulate freely (law of 4 October 1828) at its intrinsic value, but it restricted and then prohibited the import of copper coin and the circulation of Buenos Aires bank notes (March 1829).

In January 1831, Gen. Fructuoso Rivera demonetized all copper coin in circulation, i.e., the coppers ceased to be legal tender for individuals and would be neither received nor paid out by public offices. Next, it was withdrawn at one patacón (8 reales) in silver or gold for 13 reales in copper.

To meet the need for small change, the government obtained Buenos Aires coins of one-tenth real (décimos de la ciudad de Buenos Aires; 24 mm, dated 1822 and 1823), and put about 1·6 million of them into circulation at half face value (Law 17 of 15 March 1831). This is considered the first money issued by República Oriental del Uruguay.

Finally, the government created a new monetary system (Law 208 of 20 June 1839), known as Sistema real, with accounts kept in a patacón (peso) of 8 reales, each of 100 centésimos. The patacón was a silver coin, 27·06 g, 0·902 fine (24·43 g fine silver). The standard gold coin was the onza de oro of 27·06 g, 0·875 fine, equal to 16 silver pesos. Other silver and gold coins were rated in terms of the patacón and onza, according to their intrinsic value.

Law 208 also authorized the minting of 20,000 pesos in copper coin, but only about 500 pesos in coins, dated 1840, were actually produced. The Government put the first of these coins into circulation on 15 October 1840 (and, since 1990, Uruguay has celebrated 15 October as "Día de la Numismática Nacional").

Copper coins and a silver peso were authorized by laws 254 and 255 of 13 December 1843, during Uruguay's long civil war, known as La Guerra Grande. The government established a mint (La Casa de Moneda de Montevideo) that produced three copper denominations and a silver peso fuerte or peso del Sitio (aka Montevideo dollar in English).

=== Paper ===
Uruguay did not issue any paper money during this period, but paper near-money did appear. The Law of 26 January 1831 provided for a copper exchange company (Sociedad encambio del cobre) to issue notes for 1 and 5 pesos in exchange for copper coin. These notes were payable to bearer at sight after 90 days in gold onzas, silver pesos fuertes or patacones, or in subsidiary Brazilian silver, and they were received by government offices at par with silver and gold coin.

A law of 29 April 1835 authorized a foreign loan to pay off a portion of the national debt, and provided for the issue of up to $700,000 in polizas de deuda pública (public debt drafts). These were high-denomination vales (promissory notes) for 400, 500, 2000, and 5000 pesos, payable to bearer.

=== Coins ===
==== 1840 issue ====
Uruguay's first coins were two copper, centésimo denominations dated 1840, struck by a private firm (Taller Augustín Jouve) in Montevideo, the type being that of a radiate sun face: 5c, 24 mm (≈6000 pieces); and, 20c, 27·00 g, 37 mm (≈18,500 pieces). The 5c coin was known as cinquiño (from Portuguese cinquinho or maybe Galician cinquiño), the 20c as a vintén (from Portuguese vintém).

==== 1843–1844 issue ====
The three copper, centésimo coins of 1843–1844 are of the same type as those of 1840: 5c, 5·38 g, 24 mm (≈6000 dated 1844); 20c, 21·50 g, 24 mm (15,000 dated 1843, 10,000 dated 1844); and, 40c, 43·00 g, 40 mm (65,000 dated 1844).

The peso fuerte of 1844 was 27·07 g, 35 mm, ≈0·875 fine (23·69 g fine silver), and was the only silver coin minted at Montevideo. It was made by melting down silver objects donated by the Montevideo residents. Only about 1226 pieces were produced. First coins were struck on January 19. or 20th., and given to Government authorities on Jan. 22nd. Official issue date was set on 15 February 1844, possibly after production ended. It was a siege coin, issued to city Government be able to pay defending troops and supplies. Its circulation outside the city of Montevideo was prohibited by the government of Gen. Manuel Oribe.

== 1854–1856 Real ==
Escudo = 10 Reales = 1000 Centésimos de real (for gold)

Patacón = 10 Reales = 1000 Centésimos de real (for silver)

=== History ===
Legislation of 22 July 1854 authorized the minting of gold coins (Law 414) of 1, 2, and 4 escudos (10, 20, and 40 reales), silver coins (Law 415) of 1 1/4, 2 1/2, and 5 reales (125, 250, and 500 centésimos), and copper coins (Law 418) of 10, 20, and 40 centésimos. Law 414 defined the gold 10 reales (escudo) as 1·6175 g, 0·875 fine, or 1415·325 mg fine gold, giving a silver:gold ratio of ≈14.75:1. The chaotic internal situation, complicated by strife in Brazil and Argentina, intervened, so that the gold and silver coins were never produced, and the authorized copper coinage was produced in a modified form. The mint in Montevideo closed early in 1855; thereafter, Uruguay's coins were minted abroad.

=== Paper ===
The Treasury issued promissory notes (vales de Tesorería), dated 12 July 1855, in denominations of 2 and 4 reales, and 1, 5, 10, 25, 50, and 100 pesos.

=== Coins ===
Two copper denominations were struck at the Montevideo mint in 1854–1855: 5c, 5·38 g, 24 mm (120,000 dated 1854, 8000 dated 1855); and 20c, 21·50 g, 38 mm (50,000 dated 1854, 30,000 dated 1855). Rare patterns exist of the 40-reales gold piece.

== 1856–1863 Peso fuerte and Patacón ==
Onza de oro = 16 Pesos (Patacones) = 15,360 Centésimos (for gold)

Patacón ($) = 8 Reales = 960 Centésimos (for old silver)

Peso fuerte ($F) = 10 Reales = 1000 Centésimos (for new silver)

=== History ===
In 1856 the Onza de oro was revalued from 16,000 centésimos to 15,360, and the patacón to 960 centésimos to reflect new monetary legislation. Laws 523 and 524 of 13 June 1857 modified laws 414 (gold) and 415 (silver) of 1854. The same standard of weight and fineness was retained, but the denomination was changed to peso fuerte, with proposed coins of 1/8, 1/4, 1/2, and 1 peso fuerte in silver, and 2, 4, 8, and 16 pesos fuertes in gold.

Uruguay's first postage stamps appeared in October 1856 for use on mail coach routes operated by Anastasio Lapido; the denominations were 60 and 80 centavos and 1 real (= 120 centavos). A second series followed in March 1858 in denominations of 120, 180, and 240 centavos (centésimos). Regular government stamps appeared in July 1859 in denominations of 60, 80, 100, 120, 180, and 240 centésimos.

=== Paper ===
New banking regulations were passed in 1851 and the first private banknotes appeared in circulation in 1857. Bank notes of this period were denominated in the onza de oro of 15,360 centésimos and its fractions.

Banco Mauá & Cia. of Montevideo was a branch of the Brazilian bank of that name; it enjoyed special privileges of note issue as the financial agent of Brazilian policy. It put notes of 240, 480, and 960 centésimos into circulation in September 1857. A second series followed in 1861 with the same three denominations and also a note for 1 onza de oro,

Banco Comercial of Montevideo was founded in 1857 by a group of merchants. It was a successful and well-run bank that issued a series of notes dated 1 October 1858 for 120, 240, 480, and 960 centésimos and 1 onza de oro. A second issue, dated 1 January 1860 was for 240, 480, and 960 centésimos.

El Banco del Salto issued denominations of 120, 480, and 960 centésimos, dated 1 October 1858.

Banco de Paysandú issued notes for 120, 240, 480, and 960 centésimos, printed in Montevideo and dated 27 September 1862.

=== Coins ===
No gold or silver coins were minted during this period, but copper coins of the same design, denomination, and weight as those of 1854–1855 were minted at Lyon, with the date 1857: 5c (0·576 million), 20c (0·576 million), 40c (1·08 million).

== 1863–1875 Peso and Doblón ==
Doblón de oro = 10 Pesos plata = 1000 Centésimos (1863–1868)

Peso = 100 Centésimos

=== History ===
The National Currency Decree of 23 June 1862 (with effect from 1 January 1863) made the gold doblón and the silver peso the national currency (moneda nacional). It defined the doblón de oro (which replaced the onza de oro) as weighing 16·97 g, 0·917 fine (one gold peso equivalent to 1556·149 mg fine gold), and equal to 10 silver pesos, each of 25·48 g, 0·917 fine (23·365 g fine silver), giving a silver:gold ratio of 15:1. The peso was revalued to 100 centésimos, with 1 new centésimo equal to 10 old centésimos de real, the new currency being known as Sistema centesimal (as opposed to the old Sistema real).

The National Currency Decree declared that until a national coinage could be minted, foreign silver and gold coins should continue to circulate at their then current values (adjusted to conform to this decree), A number of foreign coins (and their multiples and fractions) were specified and rated. Foreign silver coins rated $1·00 (one peso) were the pesos of Spain and Mexico, the Brazilian patacón of 960 reis (25 g, 0·917 fine), and the Brazilian two-milreis piece (25·495 g, 0·900 fine). The 5-franc piece of France and the 5-lire of Italy, both 25 g, 0·900 fine, were rated 90c. The gold onza of Spain and the Americas (27·450 g, 0·875 fine) was rated $15·36; the 20-reis of Brazil (17·926 g, 0·917 fine), $10·56; the Napoleon of 20 francs and the 20-franc piece of Sardinia (6·451 g, 0·900 fine), $3·60; the British sovereign (7·981 g, 0·917 fine), $4·70; the Spanish doblón of 100 reales vellón (8·336 g, 0·901 fine), $4·80; the Chilean condór (15·253 g, 0·900 fine), $9·00; the American eagle (16·717 g, 0·900 fine), $9·60.

Postage stamps of 6, 8, 10, and 12 (new) centésimos replaced the old denominations of 60, 80, 100, and 120 in February 1864.

Uruguay was in a state of turmoil and civil strife; there were repeated runs on the banks. Mauá Bank survived a brief run in January 1864. It floated a loan for the government of Gen. Flores in December, and when it suffered another run in 1865, the government suspended specie payments for the two note-issuing banks and demanded forced loans. Banco Comercial demonstrated its soundness during the panic that followed. After the crisis, a new banking law was passed, which was the signal for a boom in bank creation. Suspension of convertibility ended in June.

The Overend Gurney crisis on the London financial market in May 1866 hit Uruguay, where Mauá Bank faced another run. The government owed it large sums and came to its aid by suspending banknote convertibility into specie until 1 December 1866. Banco Comercial and Londres y Río de la Plata were sound and did not need this protection, so when another major crisis occurred in 1868 and the government again suspended convertibility, they continued paying out gold for their notes. An economic revival followed, only to end in 1875, due to further political disorder.

The Uruguayan banks weathered the worldwide depression that began in 1873, but the government was overthrown in January 1875, and Mauá Bank declared bankruptcy in February. The new government suspended payment on its London debt, and on 8 May it decreed government currency notes the only recognized money for legal contracts. The use of gold was prohibited and business came to a standstill. Retail prices shot up; banks failed. The two surviving banks of issue (Comercial and Londres y Río de la Plata) contracted with over fifty major business firms to pay all obligations in gold, despite the government decree.

=== Paper ===
==== 1863–1875 banknotes ====
Banco Comercial de Paysandú began issuing in 1873. Then the new banking regulations (Villalba Law) of 25 March 1865 allowed banks of issue to be formed on very favorable terms. The Italiano, the Montevideano, and the Londres y Rio de la Plata began issuing in 1865, Navia y Ca. and Comercial del Salto in 1866; Oriental in 1867; Sociedad Fomento Territorial, Sociedad de Crédito Hipotecario, and Progreso Oriental in 1868, Franco-Platense in 1871; Herrera, Eastman y Ca, Viñas y Ca., Villaamil & Ca., and Mercantil del Rio de la Plata in 1873. Bank notes of this period were denominated in either the doblón de oro of 10 pesos or in the peso moneda nacional of 100 centésimos.

==== 1868 emergency postal scrip ====
Due to a chronic shortage of small change, the government followed the example of U.S. postal currency: copies of current postage stamps in denominations of 1, 5, 10, and 20 centésimos were prepared with extra-wide margins and issued to serve as small change.

==== 1870 currency notes ====
A law of 4 May 1870 authorized the Junta de Crédito Público to issue a series of notes guaranteed by the government (Emisión garantida). The notes were prepared in England by Waterlow and Sons in denominations of 20 and 50 centésimos and 1, 5, 10, 20, 50, and 100 pesos. They were not payable on demand.

==== 1875 currency notes ====
The Junta de Crédito Público was authorized to make a national note issue (Emisión Nacional) by a law of 25 January 1875, in denominations of 20 and 50 centésimos and 1, 2, and 5 pesos. The government also issued 1875-dated notes of 5 and 50 pesos, printed by A. Godel of Montevideo, in the name of La Républica Oriental del Uruguay.

=== Coins ===
A new bronze centésimo coinage of reduced weight, dated 1869, was minted at Paris (mint mark 'A') and Birmingham (mint mark 'H'): 1c, 5·00 g, 25 mm (1 million A, 1 million H); 2c, 10·00 g, 30 mm (3 million A, 2 million H); and 4c, 20·00 g, 35 mm (2 million A, 6·25 million H).

== 1875–1896 Peso (Latin Monetary Union silver) ==
Peso = 100 Centésimos

Doblón de oro = 10 Pesos

=== History ===
The economic bottom had been reached in 1875. In 1873 Uruguay had aligned its silver peso on the Spanish duro and French écu of the Latin Monetary Union, both 25·00 g, 0·900 fine, and had posted new coin ratings in October 1873, but political and economic events prevented implementation of the new coinage until 1877. Then, from 1877 to 1895, silver coins of 10, 20 and 50 centésimos and 1 peso were coined on the Latin Monetary Union standard.

Meanwhile, the paper currency was reformed in 1875. Old paper money was withdrawn from circulation and new, convertible government notes were released. This new paper peso was known as peso moneda national (peso national currency).

The economy picked up after 1876 and the 1880s were a period of prosperity and expansion. Internal peace was achieved in 1884, and there was a heavy influx of foreign capital. The Reus Law of 1887 made it easy to establish new banks (the most important of which was Banco Nacional). While Uruguay's neighbors, Argentina and Brazil, were obliged to use inconvertible paper currency, Uruguay continued to use gold.

By 1889 the flow of foreign capital was drying up, and the prices paid for Uruguay's exports were falling. Gold was leaving the country, and Banco Nacional encountered difficulties. The effects of the Baring financial crisis of 1890 were severe for Uruguay (and Argentina). Banco Nacional's notes were refused by some other banks, and it suspended specie payments on 5 July 1890. Panic resulted; businesses failed and there was a run on all the banks. Just as in 1875, the business community and the sound banks honored their obligations in gold and refused depreciated paper. The panic subsided on 7 July, but the affairs of Banco Nacional were a hopeless mess, and the government could not meet the interest payments on its debts. The financial crisis of 1890–1893 destroyed many of the commercial banks.

After Banco Nacional collapsed, the Londres y Río de la Plata's note issue accounted for over half of Uruguay's sound paper money. It was unthinkable to have the paper currency of an independent nation in the hands of a foreign bank, and in 1896 the government established a new national bank, Banco de la República, with a monopoly of issue.

=== Paper ===
==== 1875–1896 private banknotes ====
Note issues were continued by El Banco Comercial and Banco de Londres y Río de la Plata. New banks of issue appeared in 1883–1889: Banco Villaamil & Ca., Banco Inglés del Rio de la Plata, El Banco de Crédito Auxiliar, Banco Italiano del Uruguay, Banco de España y Rio de la Plata, Banco Popular, Banco Italo-Oriental, and La Sociedád Auxiliar de Crédito y Alquileres. Banco de Londres y Rio de la Plata and Banco Italiano del Uruguay survived the crisis of the 1890s, but their right to issue notes lapsed when their charters came up for renewal (1904 and 1907, respectively), and private bank notes were legally abolished in 1909.

==== 1875 currency redemption notes ====
The government tasked the Comision de Extincion de Billetes (note-withdrawal commission) with redeeming valueless and obsolete paper money, It began withdrawing old notes in June 1875. It replaced the withdrawn notes with unissued government notes dated 27 March 1875 and overprinted “Comisión de Extinción de Billetes” in a rectangle. These were notes for 20 and 50 centésimos and 1, 2, 5, 10, 20, 50, and 100 pesos moneda corriente (pesos in circulating currency), printed by American Bank Note Company.

==== 1886 treasury notes ====
The government authorized a restricted issue (Emisión Limitada) of $1,900,000 in treasury promissory notes (vales del Tesoro) of 1 and 10 pesos, dated 11 August 1886.

==== 1887 Banco Nacional notes ====
Banco Nacional de la República Oriental del Uruguay was established in 1887 as Uruguay's national bank. It issued a series of notes dated 25 August 1887, printed by Waterlow and Sons: 10, 20, and 50 centésimos and 1, 2, 5, 10, 20, 50, 100, 200, and 500 pesos moneda nacional oro sellado (national gold currency). Banco Nacional failed in the financial crisis of 1893. Its outstanding notes were redeemed by the government in 1896.

=== Coins ===
The silver peso, 25·00 g, dated 1877 (300,000 pieces) was 0·917 fine but all subsequent issues were 0·900 fine (0·1 million 1878, 1·1 million 1893, 1 million 1895). The other silver coins, all 0·900 fine, were: 10c, 2·50 g (3 million 1877, 1 million 1893); 20c, 5·00 g (1·5 million 1877, 0·75 million 1893); and 50c, 12·50 g (4 million 1877, 0·5 million 1893, 0·8 million 1894),

== 1896–1935 Peso en moneda legal (gold standard) ==
Peso = 100 Centésimos

=== History ===
In 1896 Uruguay adopted the gold standard based on a peso oro of 1·697 g 0·917 fine or 1556·149 mg fine gold (par: US$1·03, 4s3d sterling, 5·361 francs). A monopoly of issue was granted to El Banco de la Republica Oriental del Uruguay and the country enjoyed a sound currency and monetary stability until World War I. Bank notes were denominated in legal tender currency (en moneda legal).

The gold standard was suspended in August 1914, and foreign gold coin was accepted at fixed rates of 4·70 pesos for the sovereign, 9·66 for the US eagle, and 3·73 for the 20-franc piece. The peso was at a premium against the US dollar from 1915 until 1920. At one point in 1918 it took only 78·30 pesos to buy US$100. The peso then depreciated sharply, and at its low in 1921 it took 170·50 pesos to buy US$100. This was followed by steady improvement and Uruguay was able to go on a gold exchange standard in 1925, maintaining the previous gold par of US$1·0342 per peso until December 1929. Exchange controls were adopted 7 September 1931; the peso depreciated and a black market became very active. After January 1933 the currency was linked to the French franc at 12·06 francs per peso.

=== Paper ===
El Banco de la República Oriental del Uruguay was established with a monopoly of issue by a law of 4 August 1896, and it opened for business on 22 October. It was authorized to issue up to $20 million in gold notes of $10 and up, and up to $5 million in notes under $10 payable in legal currency (en moneda legal), that is, payable in gold or silver, at the option of the bank.

==== 1896–1914 regular issue ====
Banco de la República issued notes for 50 centésimos and for 1, 5, 10, 50, 100, and 500 pesos "en moneda nacional". These notes were printed by Giesecke & Devrient of Leipzig. The outbreak of war made it impossible to receive further shipments after August 1914.

==== 1915–1935 regular issue ====
When war prevented the delivery of notes from Germany, Banco de la República contracted with the British firm of Waterlow & Sons, which printed notes for 1, 5, 10, 100, and 500 pesos, featuring a portrait of J.G. Artigas.

==== 1918–1927 special issues ====
An increasing demand for notes resulted in a shortage in 1918. An emergency issue for 20c was made by surcharging unissued one peso notes and clipping the corners. The supply of 100 and 500 peso notes was augmented by a special order from Casa de Moneda of Argentina.

Due to the fluctuating price of silver, regular Waterlow and Sons notes of 5 pesos were overprinted in 1919, either with "convertible en emision mayor / 20 Feb 1919" or with "convertible en plata", making them redeemable in silver.

Again in 1927, regular Waterlow notes of 5 pesos were overprinted "Certificado Metalico - Plata / Ley de 14 de enero de 1916", making them redeemable in silver.

==== 1930 Uruguay Centennial ====
A series of notes for 1, 5, and 10 pesos, commemorating the centennial of Uruguayan independence, was printed by G. Houmiez (France).

==== 1931–1935 regular issue ====
Banco de la Républica was again able to contract with the German firm of Giesecke & Devrient, which supplied notes of 50 centésimos and 1, 5, 10, and 500 pesos, similar in design to those of the 1896 issue.

=== Coins ===
==== 1901–1941 issues ====
Uruguay issued a series of copper-nickel coins of 1, 2, and 5 centésimos, weighing 2·00 g, 3·50 g, and 5·00 g, respectively. Dates were 1901 (6 million 1c, 7·5 million 2c, 6 million 5c), 1909 (5 million 1c, 10 million 2c, 5 million 5c), 1924 (3 million 1c, 11 million 2c, 5 million 5c), 1936 (2 million 1c, 6·5 million 2c, 3 million 5c), and 1941 (10 million 2c, 2·4 million 5c).

Silver coins were also issued during this period: 20c, 5·00 g, 0·800 fine ( 2·5 million 1920); 50c, 12·50 g, 0·900 fine (0·4 million 1916, 5 million 1917); 1 peso, 25·00 g, 0·900 fine (2 million 1917).

==== 1930 Uruguay Centennial ====
Commemorative coins dated 1930 marked Uruguay's independence centennial: 10c, aluminium-bronze, 8·00 g, 27 mm (5 million); 20c, silver, 5·00 g, 0·800 fine, 25 mm (2·5 million); and, 5 pesos, gold, 8·4850 g, 0·917 fine, 22 mm (14,415 released).

== 1935–1975 Peso ==
Peso = 100 Centésimos

=== History ===
Banco de la República was not only the government bank, acting as a central bank with a monopoly of issue, it was also the largest commercial bank in Uruguay. A law of 14 August 1935 made its issue department (El Departmento de Emisión) autonomous, and provided for a revaluation of the Bank's metallic reserves by confirming (16 August) the official exchange rate at 12.06 French francs to the peso. The old theoretical peso oro of 1.697 g, .917 fine, was abandoned, and bank notes were denominated in national currency (moneda nacional). The Bank's gold stocks were revalued by a factor of 2.2 (i.e., at 709.53 mg fine gold to the peso). The actual market rate in New York ranged US$0.46-0.57 per peso during 1936.

By 1941 the peso's official rate was 1.90 to the US dollar. A complicated system of multiple exchange rates was adopted in 1946 and adjusted frequently. The year-end rate in pesos per US dollar on the free market was: 1953, 3.04; 1957, 4.66; 1958, 10.20; 1959, 11.18. Parity was registered with the International Monetary Fund on 7 October 1960 at 7.40 per US$1, but the effective market rate remained around 11 per until 1963, when it began a precipitous decline. Year-end free market rates per US$1 were: 1963, 17.35; 1964, 24.35; 1965; 69.20; 1966, 76.50; 1967, 199.00. This depreciation reflected the declining world market for Uruguay's chief exports: wool, meat and meat products, and hides.

Banco de la República was replaced by a true central bank, Banco Central del Uruguay, which assumed responsibility for the note issue and began operations on 1 March 1967. Exchange held at 250–260 pesos per US$1 in 1969–1971, A currency reform was planned, but postponed as the peso began another rapid decline. By April 1973 the US dollar fetched 1,300 pesos on the open market.

=== Paper ===
==== 1937–1950 Banco de la República ====
Notes issued in conformity with the law of 1935 were printed in England by de la Rue and put into circulation in 1937: 50 centésimos and 1, 5, 100, 500, and 1000 pesos. A 10-peso note was added in 1943. The notes of this series are undated. The earliest emissions had two engraved signature-titles. From 1945 there were three engraved signature-titles. After 1947 the three titles were lithographed.

==== 1948–1967 Banco de la República ====
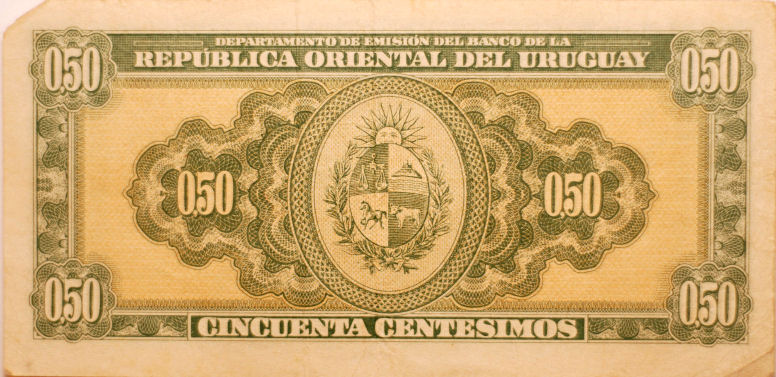
50 Centésimos Law of 1939 (back)

Undated notes of a new design and reduced size, also printed by de la Rue, referencing the Law of 2 January 1939, were introduced in 1948 for 1, 5, 10, and 100 pesos, with notes for 50, 500, and 1000 pesos following in 1952. A metal thread was added to the notes in 1957 for greater security. A 0.50 note, printed by Casa de Moneda de Chile was put into circulation in 1966.

==== 1967–1975 Banco Central ====
The first notes released by Banco Central were Banco de la República notes of 10, 50, 100, 500, and 1000 pesos with Banco Central de la República or Banco Central del Uruguay appearing in the signature titles. Banco Central also began issuing a new series of notes of uniform size (155 × 69 mm), featuring a portrait of J.G. Artigas: 50, 100, 500, 1000, 5000, and 10,000 pesos. There are two different designs of the 1000, and two different designs of the 10,000.

=== Coins ===
==== 1936–1951 issues ====
Copper: 5c, 5·00 g (4 million 1944, 2 million 1946, 2 million 1947, 3 million 1948, 2·8 million 1949, 15 million 1951).

Aluminium-bronze: 10c, 6·00 g, 25 mm (2 million 1936).

Silver: 20c, 3·00 g, 0·720 fine (18 million 1942); 50c, 7·00 g, 0·700 fine (10·8 million 1943); $1, 9·00 g, 0·720 fine (9 million 1942).

==== 1953–1959 issues ====
Copper-nickel 1c, 1·50 g (5 million 1953); 5c, 3·50 g (17·5 million 1953) 10c, 4·50 g (28·25 million 1953, 10 million 1959).

Silver: 20c, 3·00 g, 0.720 fine, 19 mm (10 million 1954).

==== 1960–1965 issues ====
Nickel-bronze: 5c, 3·50 g (88 million 1960); 10c, 4·50 g (72·5 million 1960).

Copper-nickel: 25c (48 million 1960); 50c (18 million 1960); 1 peso (8 million 1960).

Aluminium: 20c (40 million 1965); 50c (50 million 1965).

Aluminium-bronze: $5 (18 million 1965); $10 (18 million 1965).

Silver, commemorating the Revolt Against Spain Sesquicentennial: $10, 12·50 g, 0·900 fine (3 million 1961).

==== 1968 issue ====
Nickel-bronze, 1968: $1, 17.3 mm (103·2 million); $5 (42·68 million); $10, 23 mm (90 million).

==== 1969–1973 issues ====
Aluminium-brass, 1969: $1 (51·8 million); $5 (42·32 million); $10 (10 million).

Copper-nickel: $20 (50 million 1970); $50 (20 million 1970); $100 pesos (20 million 1973).

Nickel-brass, commemorating the birth centenary of J.E. Rodó: $50 (15 million 1971)

== 1975–1993 Nuevo peso ==
Nuevo peso (N$) = 100 Centésimos

Conversion: 1 nuevo peso = 1,000 old pesos

=== History ===
The nuevo peso (N$; ISO 4217 code: UYP) replaced the peso on 1 July 1975 at 1 new to 1,000 old. The initial exchange rate was UYP 1.50 per USD 1.00, but depreciation began within two months. The average annual exchange rate, nuevos pesos per US$1 was: 1974, 2.30; 1975, 2.75; 1976, 3.40; 1977, 4.75; 1978, 6.13; 1979, 7.92; and 1980, 9.16, A managed float began on 26 November 1982 and by 1988 the average rate was N$451 per US$1.

=== Paper ===
==== 1975–1990 issues ====
To serve as new pesos, old notes of 500, 1,000, 5,000, and 10,000 pesos were surcharged with a new denomination (½, 1, 5, and 10 nuevos pesos, respectively) and "Ley № 14.316" in a 24 mm circle, and put into circulation in July 1973.

Definitive notes also appeared in 1975 for N$50 (16 December) and N$100 (25 November). These bore the text "pagará al portador y a la vista" (will pay to the bearer at sight), which had appeared on all national paper currency since 1896. This text was eliminated when notes of 50, 100, 500, and 1,000 nuevos pesos were released during 1978. Notes were payable in nuevos pesos moneda nacional (new pesos national currency).

New denominations were introduced between 1983 and 1990 with a central design other than a portrait of J.G. Artigas (which had dominated note design since 1915). A note for N$5000 (Brig. Gen. J.A. Lavalleja) appeared in 1983, and notes for N$200 (J.E. Rodó) and N$10,000 (National Flag Monument) in 1987.

==== 1990–1993 issue ====
A new series of notes, featuring portraits of eminent Uruguayans, began appearing in 1990 with denominations of N$2,000, N$20,000, and $N50,000. As inflation progressed, Banco Central released notes for N$100,000 (30 November 1991), N$200,000 (30 October 1992), and N$500,000 (1 March 1993). The last three banknotes based in uncirculated versions of N$1,000 , N$5,000 and N$10,000 designed in 1989.

=== Coins ===
==== 1977–1981 issues ====
Aluminium: 1c, 19 mm (1977); 2c, 21 mm (1977, 1978); 5c, 23 mm (1977, 1978).

Aluminium-bronze: 10c, 3.10 g, 19 mm (1976, 1977, 1978, 1981); 20c, 5·10 g, 22 mm (1976, 1977, 1978); 50c, 7·00 g, 25.5 mm (1976, 1977, 1981); N$1, 30 mm (1976, 1977, 1978).

Aluminium-nickel: N$1, 5.90 g, 24 mm (1980).

Copper-nickel-zinc: N$2, 7.10 g, 25 mm (1981).

Copper-nickel: N$5, 7.90 g, 26·15 mm (1980); N$10, 9.80 g, 28 mm (1981).

==== 1989 issue ====
Stainless steel coins in nuevos pesos dated 1989: 1, 5, 10, 50, 100, 200, and 500.

== Since 1993 Peso uruguayo ==
Peso uruguayo ($) = 100 Centésimos

Conversion: 1 peso uruguayo = 1000 nuevos pesos

The peso uruguayo ($; ISO 4217 code: UYU) was adopted on 1 March 1993 to replace the nuevo peso at 1 peso uruguayo for 1000 nuevos pesos. Withdrawal of old notes of N$500 and under began immediately; notes of 1,000 up to 500,000 nuevos pesos remained legal tender (for 1 to 500 pesos uruguayos) until 28 February 2003.

The first banknote denominated in pesos uruguayos moneda nacional, the $20 (dated 1994), did not appear in circulation until 22 February 1995. By the end of 1995, denominations of 10, 50, 100, 200, and 500 were in circulation. A $1000 was added in 1996, and a $2000 in 2003. A new series of notes began appearing in November 2006.
