= Croatian dinar =

Former currency of Croatia

hrvatski dinar (Croatian)

ISO 4217
- Code: HRD

Denominations
- Banknotes: 1, 5, 10, 25, 100, 500, 1000, 2000, 5000, 10,000, 50,000, 100,000 dinars
- Coins: None

Demographics
- Date of introduction: 23 December 1991
- Replaced: Yugoslav dinar
- Date of withdrawal: 30 May 1994
- Replaced by: Croatian kuna
- User(s): Croatia

Issuance
- Central bank: Croatian National Bank
- Website: www.hnb.hr
- This infobox shows the latest status before this currency was rendered obsolete.

The Croatian dinar was the official currency of Croatia between 1991 and 1994, replacing the Yugoslav dinar. The currency's ISO 4217 code was HRD.

== History ==
The Croatian dinar replaced the 1990 version of the Yugoslav dinar at par on 23 December 1991. It was a transitional currency introduced following Croatia's declaration of independence. During its existence, the dinar declined in value by a factor of about 70. On 30 May 1994, the dinar was replaced by the kuna at a rate of 1 kuna = 1000 dinara. The currency was not used in the occupied territories comprising the Republic of Serbian Krajina.

== Banknotes ==
Denomination	Date of issue
1 dinar	8 October 1991
5 dinars	8 October 1991
10 dinars	8 October 1991
25 dinars	8 October 1991
100 dinars	8 October 1991
500 dinars	8 October 1991
1,000 dinars	8 October 1991
2,000 dinars	15 January 1992
5,000 dinars	15 January 1992
10,000 dinars	15 January 1992
50,000 dinars	30 May 1993
100,000 dinars	30 May 1993

The obverse of all banknotes was the same, with a picture of Croatian Dubrovnik scientist Ruđer Bošković. Notes up to 1000 dinara had the Zagreb cathedral on reverse. The higher denominations featured the Ivan Meštrović sculpture History of the Croats on the reverse.

== See also ==
- Dinar
- Yugoslav dinar
- Krajina dinar
- Croatian kuna
