= Nada más que la verdad =

Colombian game show

- Created by: Howard Schultz
- Years: 2007

Films and television
- Television series: Nothing but the Truth (independent international versions, see below)

Miscellaneous
- Genre: Game show
- First aired: 23 May 2007; 19 years ago

Nada más que la verdad (Nothing but the Truth) is a game show created by Howard Schultz, an American television producer and owner of Lighthearted Entertainment. It was first aired in Colombia. The hosts asks the contestants a series of 21 increasingly personal and embarrassing questions for a huge jackpot. The format has been exported to 47 countries, and appears in most countries as The Moment of Truth.

== Format ==
Prior to the show, a contestant is hooked up to a polygraph and asked between 50 and 80 questions. Without knowing the results of the polygraph test, he or she is asked 21 of those same questions again on the program, each becoming more personal in nature. If the contestant answers honestly as confirmed by the polygraph, he or she moves on to the next question. A person may stop at any time before any question is asked and collect the money they have won. Honestly answering all 21 questions wins the jackpot. If the participant is found to be lying, he or she loses everything and the game is over.

== International versions ==
Country	Name	Host	Channel	Premiere	Jackpot	Jackpot in USD (converted with the rate from the premiere year)
(Arab League) Arab World	لحظة الحقيقة; Lahzat Elhaqiqa	Abbas El Nouri	MBC1	April 15, 2011	SR500,000	133,333.33
Brazil	Nada Além da Verdade	Silvio Santos	SBT	January 20, 2008	R$100,000	54,532.57
Brazil	Nada Além da Verdade	Carlos Massa	SBT	2009–2010	R$100,000	54,532.57
Bulgaria	Цената на истината Cenata na istinata	Vitomir Saraivanov	Nova TV	September 9, 2009	200,000 лв	142,177.57
Bulgaria	Big Brother: Истината; Big Brother: Istinata _{(Special season only for the Big Brother Family participants)}	Vitomir Saraivanov	Nova TV	April 3, 2010	50,000 лв	
Chile	El momento de la verdad	Sergio Lagos	Canal 13	July 20, 2017	CLP$$50,000,000	
Colombia	Nada más que la verdad	Jorge Alfredo Vargas	Canal Caracol	May 23, 2007	CO$100,000,000	48,116.44
Croatia	Trenutak istine	Jasna Nanut	Nova TV	September 2008	500,000 kn	101,316.31
Czech Republic	Nic než pravda	Petr Šiška	TV Prima	September 25, 2008	5,000,000 Kč	292,882.94
Denmark	Sandhedens Time	Lars Hjortshøj	TV3	September 17, 2008	Kr. 500,000	98,075.16
Estonia	Tõehetk	Hannes Võrno	Kanal 2	September 1, 2008	1,000,000 EEK	94,001.25
Finland	Totuuden hetki	Ilari Johansson	MTV3	Spring 2009	€50,000	69,740
Georgia	სიმართლის დრო Simartlis Dro	Nanka Kalatozishvili	Imedi TV	Winter 2009	100,000 ლ	59,862.78
Germany	Die Wahrheit und nichts als die Wahrheit	Christoph Bauer	RTL2	Late 2008	€25,000	36,770
Greece	Η Στιγμή της Αλήθειας; I Stigmi Tis Alithias	Eugenia Manolidou	ANT1	October 10, 2008	€200,000	294,160
Hong Kong	真實謊言; Chen shih huang yen	Johnson Lee	TVB Jade	Canceled before airing	N/A	
Hungary	Az Igazság Ára	Gabriella Jakupcsek	TV2	March 5, 2008	20,000,000 Ft	116,202.5
India	Sacch Ka Saamna	Rajeev Khandelwal	Star Plus	July 15, 2009	₹10,000,000	206,590.66
Israel	הפוליגרף; Hapoligraf	Gadi Sukenik	Channel 2	July 9, 2008	₪1,000,000	278,705.15
Italy	Il momento della verità	Paola Perego	Italia 1	June 12, 2008	€250,000	367,700
Netherlands	Het Moment Van De Waarheid	Robert ten Brink	RTL 4	September 6, 2008	€100,000	147,080
North Macedonia	Момент на вистината Moment na vistinata	Aneta Kociski	А1	February 2009	3,000,000 MKD	68,026.32
Norway	Sannhetens øyeblikk	Stein Johnsen	TVNORGE	2008	500,000 Kr	88,652.48
Pakistan	Lakhon Ka Suchh	Adil Murad	A-Plus TV	December 28, 2010	₨.1,000,000 (₨.2,000,000 in Season 2)	11,656.63
Peru	El valor de la verdad	Beto Ortiz	Latina	July 7, 2012	S/ 50,000	18,956.72
Poland	Moment prawdy	Zygmunt Chajzer	Polsat	March 5, 2009	250,000 zł	80,124.57
Portugal	O Momento da Verdade	Teresa Guilherme	SIC	September 9, 2008	€250,000	367,700
Romania	Momentul Adevărului	Teo va	Prima TV	March 3, 2008	150,000 lei	59,550.79
Russia	Детектор лжи Detektor lži	Andrey Malakhov	1TV	July 24, 2010	₽1,000,000	32,929.49
Russia	Детектор; Detector	Mark Barton	Friday!	February 8, 2022	₽1,000,000	
Serbia	Trenutak Istine; Тренутак истине	Tatjana Vojtehovski Stevanov	RTV Pink	February 4, 2009	5,000,000 RSD	73,985.73
Slovenia	Trenutek Resnice	Jonas Žnidaršič	TV3 Slovenia	April 6, 2009	€50,000	69,740
South Korea	The Moment of Truth Korea	Gura Kim	QTV	July 11, 2009	₩100,000,000	78,312.83
Spain	El juego de tu vida	Emma García	Telecinco	April 2, 2008	€100,000	147,080
Sweden	Sanningens Ögonblick	Pontus Gårdinger	Kanal 5	April 20, 2008	500,000 Kr	75,859.88
Taiwan	真實謊言; Chen shih huang yen	Li Jin	NextTV	July 4, 2011	NTD2,000,000	69,671.85
Ukraine	Детектор брехні Detektor brekhni	Dmitry Karpachev	SТB	April 2, 2012	₴150,000	18,771.05
United Kingdom	Nothing But the Truth	Jerry Springer	Sky One	November 10, 2007	£50,000	100,045.69
United States	The Moment of Truth	Mark L. Walberg	FOX	January 23, 2008	US$500,000	500,000.00

== Controversies ==
The Colombian version was cancelled in October 2007 after a female contestant named Rosa Maria Solano was asked "¿Usted le pagó a un sicario para mandar matar a su marido?", meaning, "Did you pay a hit man to have your husband killed?" and she answered "Sí", meaning, "yes" to the question. (The person she hired tipped off her husband, who then fled.) She later walked away with 50 million Colombian pesos, or about US$25,000.

During the premiere episode of the Peruvian version, hosted by Beto Ortiz in Lima, 19-year-old contestant Ruth Thalia Sayas Sanchez revealed to her family, including her boyfriend Bryan Romero Leiva, among other things, that she had participated in sex work. Following the appearance, Sayas disappeared two months later, and was eventually discovered in a well on Romero's uncle's property. Romero was later charged with the murder of Sayas, citing the admission on the show as the motive.
