= Sacch Ka Saamna =

- Created by: Howard Schultz
- Directed by: Arun Sheshkumar
- Country of origin: India
- Original language: Hindi
- No. of seasons: 2
- No. of episodes: 106

Production
- Producer: Siddhartha Basu
- Running time: Approx. 25 minutes

Original release
- Network: StarPlus (Season 1); Life OK (Season 2)
- Release: 15 July 2009 – 22 April 2012

Related
- The Moment of Truth

Sacch Ka Saamna (transl. Face the Truth) is an Indian reality television which aired on STAR Plus from 15 July 2009. The second season of the series premiered on 18 December 2011 on Life OK. Both seasons were hosted by Rajeev Khandelwal. The show is based on Nada más que la verdad.

== Format ==
The show is based on the same format as The Moment of Truth. The format is owned by Howard Schultz of Lighthearted Entertainment.

Prior to appearing on the show, contestants are asked 50 questions while hooked up to a polygraph machine. The biological indicators of the contestant, such as pulse rate, blood pressure, etc. are measured and used by the polygraph to decide whether their answer is true or not. The contestant is not aware of the results of the polygraph for his or her answers.

During the actual show, the contestant is asked 21 of the same questions again. If the contestant answers honestly, he or she moves on to the next question; however, should a contestant lie in his or her answer, or simply refuse to answer a question after it has been asked, the game ends and the contestant loses all their prize money.

There are six levels of prize money in the game. The first level consists of six questions, and answering all of them truthfully will win the contestant Rs. 1,00,000 of prize money. The next level has five questions and the prize money goes up to Rs. 5,00,000. The third, fourth and fifth levels consist of four, three and two questions respectively, with the prize money being Rs. 10,00,000, Rs. 25,00,000 and Rs. 50,00,000 respectively. The final level has only one question, with the truthful answer fetching the maximum prize money of Rs. 1 crore.

The questions become increasingly personal and potentially embarrassing in nature as the stakes get higher. The contestants are usually accompanied by close family members or friends, who are seated beside them and the host. Several of the questions tend to be related to the relationship between them and their acquaintances present there. Next to the guests is a buzzer, which they can use to override a question which they feel is better left unanswered. In that case, the contestant will be asked an alternate question which may be easier or tougher than the question it replaced. The buzzer can only be used once during the game.

The series requires contestants to sign an agreement that they will accept the conclusions drawn by the polygraph examiner. The polygraph test is done by Herb Irvine, a US-based polygraph expert.

== Series overview ==
Series	Episodes	Originally released	
Series	Episodes	First released	Last released
1	48	15 July 2009	18 September 2009
2	58	18 December 2011	22 April 2012

== Reception ==
=== Impact ===
In just its first week, some sections of people demanded the show be stopped stating that admission of gross personal or social misconduct by celebrities on national television will make it more "morally acceptable" for others to indulge in similar activity, thereby leading to a gradual weakening of society's morals.

Some others believe that sensitive and potentially devastating issues should be discussed between the contestants and their family or friends privately, and not publicly as is the case. There are also some who applaud the contestants for having the courage to bare all in full public glare. A few have even questioned the accuracy of the polygraph results. MP Kamal Akhtar took up the issue in the Rajya Sabha, arguing that the questions asked in the show were against Indian culture and demanding a halt to its screening.

=== Ratings ===
The series debuted with a rating of 4.6 TVR.
