= Trenutak istine =

- Genre: Game show
- Based on: Nada más que la verdad by Howard Schultz
- Presented by: Jasna Nanut
- Country of origin: Croatia
- Original language: Croatian
- No. of seasons: 2

Original release
- Network: Nova TV
- Release: 2008 – 2009

Trenutak istine (English: The Moment of Truth) is a Croatian game show television series based on the Colombian series Nada más que la verdad. It was produced and broadcast by Nova TV. The series puts its participants to a polygraph test in order to reveal whether or not they are telling the truth for a chance to win a great prize of 500,000 HRK (c. €69,000). It was hosted by journalist Jasna Nanut.

The first season of the series debuted in September 2008 and was broadcast Tuesdays at 9 pm. The second season premiered on 24 September 2009.

The Serbian version, produced by RTV Pink and hosted by Tatjana Vojtehovski, carries the same name. The top prize was 5,000,000 RSD (c. €50,000).

== Reception ==
Trenutak istine gained significant attention in the Croatian media and was widely considered controversial during its run. In February 2009, the Croatian Psychological Association started a petition to ban the show, describing it as exploitative and morally corrupting. In November 2009, Nova TV was forced to broadcast the series after 10 pm when the Croatian Electronic Media Agency (Croatian: Agencija za elektroničke medije) determined the series is not appropriate to air in the earlier time slot it was originally allocated to.
