= Top-rated United States television programs of 2007–08 =

This table displays the top-rated primetime television series of the 2007–08 season as measured by Nielsen Media Research.

Rank	Program	Network	Rating
1	American Idol — Tuesday	FOX	16.1
2	American Idol — Wednesday	FOX	15.9
3	Dancing with the Stars — Monday	ABC	14.0
4	Dancing with the Stars — Wednesday	ABC	12.6
5	Dancing with the Stars — Tuesday	ABC	12.3
6	Desperate Housewives	ABC	11.6
7	CSI: Crime Scene Investigation	CBS	10.6
8	House	FOX	10.5
9	Grey's Anatomy	ABC	10.4
10	Sunday Night Football	NBC	9.7
11	CSI: Miami	CBS	9.2
11	NCIS	CBS	9.2
13	Without a Trace	CBS	8.8
13	The Moment of Truth	FOX	8.8
15	Two and a Half Men	CBS	8.5
15	Survivor	CBS	8.5
17	60 Minutes	CBS	8.4
18	Criminal Minds	CBS	8.2
19	Samantha Who?	ABC	8.0
20	Lost	ABC	7.9
21	Extreme Makeover: Home Edition	ABC	7.8
22	Brothers & Sisters	ABC	7.6
22	CSI: NY	CBS	7.6
22	Heroes	NBC	7.6
22	Law & Order: Special Victims Unit	NBC	7.6
26	Private Practice	ABC	7.3
27	Law & Order	NBC	7.2
28	Cold Case	CBS	7.1
28	Deal or No Deal — Monday	NBC	7.1
30	Shark	CBS	7.0
30	The Unit	CBS	7.0
30	Hell's Kitchen	FOX	7.0
