= Nothing but the Truth (British game show) =

- Created by: Howard Schultz
- Presented by: Jerry Springer
- Country of origin: United Kingdom
- Original language: English
- No. of series: 2
- No. of episodes: 16

Production
- Running time: 60 minutes (inc. adverts)
- Production company: Ruggie Media

Original release
- Network: Sky One
- Release: 10 November 2007 – 26 March 2008

Related
- Nada más que la verdad

Nothing But the Truth is a British game show that aired on Sky1 and ran from 10 November 2007 to 26 March 2008. It was hosted by Jerry Springer. It was based on the original Colombian format Nada más que la verdad.

== Format ==
Prior to the show, contestants are asked to answer a series of questions while connected to a polygraph, but are not informed of the results. During the show, each contestant is again asked up to 21 of the questions they were asked offscreen. A voice-over, or occasionally the host, announced whether the answer is "true" or "false", based on the result of the polygraph test before the show. The contestant may stop before being asked another question and keep the money they have won so far; giving an answer deemed "false" forfeits the prize fund and ends the game. The top prize fund in this version was £50,000.

=== Money ladder ===
Questions asked get increasingly personal as the contestant moves up the ladder.

| Questions | Prize money |
|---|---|
| 21 | £50,000 |
| 19–20 | £35,000 |
| 16–18 | £20,000 |
| 12–15 | £10,000 |
| 7–11 | £5,000 |
| 1–6 | £1,000 |

== Transmissions ==
| Series | Start date | End date | Episodes |
|---|---|---|---|
| 1 | 10 November 2007 | 15 December 2007 | 6 |
| 2 | 23 January 2008 | 26 March 2008 | 10 |
