= Extreme Weight Loss =

- Genre: Reality Television
- Starring: Chris Powell; Heidi Powell
- Country of origin: United States
- Original language: English
- No. of seasons: 5
- No. of episodes: 55

Original release
- Network: ABC
- Release: May 30, 2011 – September 8, 2015

Related
- Extreme Makeover

Extreme Weight Loss (originally titled Extreme Makeover: Weight Loss Edition for its first two seasons) was a television program on ABC that premiered on May 30, 2011. The show was formally a spin-off of the Extreme Makeover franchise, where individuals receive life-changing makeovers.

== History ==
ABC announced it had ordered six episodes of the series on October 22, 2009, under the title Obese. On September 20, 2010, Chris Powell was announced as the trainer for the show, renamed Extreme Makeover: Weight Loss Edition. ABC also announced that a second season had been ordered, due to the length of time of filming (one year).

The series officially premiered on May 30, 2011 and was the top summer launch for an ABC series debut since August 2009. The second season premiered on June 3, 2012 at 9:00 p.m. (Eastern)/8:00 p.m. (Central). The third season, now renamed Extreme Weight Loss, premiered on May 28, 2013.

== Episodes ==
=== Season 1 (2011) ===
No. in series	No. in season	Person	Hometown	Original airdate	Starting weight	Ending weight	Weight loss (in %)
1	1	Rachel	Jenkinsburg, Georgia	May 30, 2011	369 lb	208 lb	43.6%
2	2	Alex	Duluth, Georgia	June 6, 2011	459 lb	243 lb	47.1%
3	3	Dana	Franklin, Tennessee	June 13, 2011	498 lb	295 lb	40.8%
4	4	James	Austin, Texas	June 20, 2011	651 lb	338 lb	48.1%
5	5	LaRhonda	Oklahoma City, Oklahoma	June 27, 2011	433 lb	231 lb	46.7%
6	6	Wally	Chicago, Illinois	July 11, 2011	490 lb	418 lb (DNF)	14.7% (DNF)
7	7	Staci	Haslet, Texas	July 18, 2011	456 lb	255 lb	44.1%
8	8	Krista	Riverside, California	July 25, 2011	445 lb	265 lb	40.4%

=== Season 2 (2012) ===
No. in series	No. in season	Person	Hometown	Original airdate	Starting weight	Ending weight	Weight loss (in %)
9	1	Tony	Woodland Hills, California	June 3, 2012	398 lb	198 lb	50.3%
10	2	Jacqui	West Palm Beach, Florida	June 10, 2012	355 lb	148 lb	58.3%
11	3	Mike	Tarpon Springs, Florida	July 1, 2012	493 lb	238 lb	51.7%
12	4	Ashley	Rancho Cucamonga, California	July 8, 2012	323 lb	167 lb	48.3%
13	5	Nyla	Houston, Texas	July 15, 2012	435 lb	278 lb	36.1%
14	6	Jonathan	Seattle, Washington	August 5, 2012	543 lb	277 lb	49.0%
15	7	Sally	Washington, D.C.	August 12, 2012	335 lb	197 lb	41.2%
16	8	Jarvez	Portland, Oregon	August 19, 2012	548 lb	267 lb	51.3%

=== Season 3 (2013) ===
No. in series	No. in season	Person	Hometown	Original airdate	Starting weight	Ending weight	Weight loss (in %)
17	1	Rebecca and David	North Prairie, Wisconsin	May 28, 2013	398 lb 470 lb	192 lb 258 lb	51.8% 45.1%
18	2	Meredith	Rochester, New York	June 4, 2013	314 lb	155 lb	50.6%
19	3	Ryan	Appleton, Wisconsin	June 25, 2013	410 lb	193 lb	52.9%
20	4	Rachel and Jason	South Lyon, Michigan	July 2, 2013	290 lb 362 lb	145 lb 197 lb	50.0% 45.6%
21	5	Jami	Philadelphia, Pennsylvania	July 9, 2013	292 lb	162 lb	44.5%
22	6	Mehrbod	Tustin, California	July 16, 2013	434 lb	230 lb	47.0%
23	7	Trina	Grosse Ile, Michigan	July 23, 2013	290 lb	145 lb	50.0%
24	8	Chantell	Elgin, Illinois	July 30, 2013	327 lb	168 lb	48.6%
25	9	Alyssa	Kalamazoo, Michigan	August 6, 2013	414 lb	210 lb	49.3%
26	10	Mike	Voorhees, New Jersey	August 13, 2013	417 lb	196 lb	53.0%
27	11	(Jason) and Ashley	Bakersfield, California	August 20, 2013	398 lb 325 lb	228 lb 161 lb	42.7% 50.5%
28	12	Cassandra	Lancaster, California	August 27, 2013	364 lb	189 lb	48.1%
29	13	Bob	Waukesha, Wisconsin	September 3, 2013	448 lb	195 lb	56.5%

=== Season 4 (2014) ===
No. in series	No. in season	Person	Hometown	Original airdate	Starting weight	Ending weight	Weight loss (in %)
30	1	Ty and Charita	Oklahoma City, Oklahoma and Colorado Springs, Colorado	May 27, 2014	480 lb 310 lb	351 lb (DNF) 160 lb	26.9 %(DNF) 48.4%
31	2	Kathie and Josh	Charlotte, North Carolina	June 3, 2014	255 lb 345 lb	147 lb 183 lb	42.4% 47.0%
32	3	Jayce	Nashville, Tennessee	June 17, 2014	417 lb	229 lb	45.1%
33	4	Bruce	Salt Lake City, Utah	June 24, 2014	382 lb	181 lb	52.6%
34	5	Melissa	Shadyside, Ohio	July 1, 2014	301 lb	159 lb	47.2%
35	6	David	St. Louis, Missouri	July 8, 2014	413 lb	212 lb	48.7%
36	7	Brandi (Note: Died November 9, 2023, at age 40)	Atlanta, Georgia	July 15, 2014	329 lb	178 lb	45.9%
37	8	Georgeanna	Tulsa, Oklahoma	July 22, 2014	315 lb	150 lb	52.4%
38	9	Cassie	Milwaukee, Wisconsin	July 29, 2014	347 lb	171 lb	50.7%
39	10	Sara	Owensboro, Kentucky	August 12, 2014	245 lb	109 lb	55.5%
40	11	Kenny and Christy	Moore, Oklahoma and Las Vegas, Nevada	August 19, 2014	410 lb 384 lb	202 lb 298 lb (DNF)	50.7% 22.4% (DNF)
41	12	Rod	Tallahassee, Florida	September 2, 2014	448 lb	260 lb	42.0%
42	13	Juliana and Jeff	Denver, Colorado	September 9, 2014	265 lb 423 lb	170 lb 218 lb	35.8% 48.5%

=== Season 5 (2015) ===
No. in series	No. in season	Person	Hometown	Original airdate	Starting weight	Ending weight	Weight loss (in %)
43	1	Robert and Raymond	Monett, Missouri	May 26, 2015	381 lb 378 lb	204 lb 213 lb	46.5% 43.7%
44	2	Kelli and Josh	Weeping Water, Nebraska and Kansas City, Kansas	June 2, 2015	331 lb 399 lb	208 lb 247 lb	37.2% 38.1%
45	3	Tiffany and Cain	New Orleans, Louisiana	June 23, 2015	260 lb 357 lb	146 lb 199 lb	43.8% 44.3%
46	4	Shane and Marissa	Ashland, Ohio	June 30, 2015	467 lb 255 lb	225 lb 169 lb	51.8% 33.7%
47	5	Bryce and Amber	Garden Grove, California	July 7, 2015	306 lb 249 lb	205 lb 155 lb	33.0% 37.8%
48	6	Jenn	Lovell, Wyoming	July 14, 2015	342 lb	182 lb	46.8%
49	7	Pearls	Wichita Falls, Texas	July 21, 2015	296 lb	147 lb	50.3%
50	8	Rachel	Los Angeles, California	July 28, 2015	309 lb	164 lb	46.9%
51	9	Panda and John	Bloomingdale, Michigan and Waldorf, Maryland	August 11, 2015	313 lb 531 lb	187 lb 316 lb	40.3% 40.5%
52	10	Mitzi	Dallas, Texas	August 18, 2015	262 lb	148 lb	43.5%
53	11	Jackie	Denver, Colorado	August 25, 2015	266 lb	144 lb	45.9%
54	12	Kim	Honolulu, Hawaii	September 1, 2015	279 lb	143 lb	48.7%
55	13	Hannah	Austin, Texas	September 8, 2015	310 lb	159 lb	48.7%

== Ratings ==
=== Season 1 (2011) ===
Episode No.	Rating	Share	Viewers (Millions)	Time Slot Rank
1	2.4	6	7.11	1
2	2.2	6	5.66	1
3	2.0	6	5.87	1
4	2.0	6	5.72	1
5	2.2	6	6.30	1
6	1.9	5	5.48	1
7	2.0	6	5.83	1
8	1.9	6	6.22	1

=== Season 2 (2012) ===
Episode No.	Rating	Share	Viewers (Millions)	Time Slot Rank
1	1.5	4	4.54	1
2	1.5	4	4.62	1
3	1.2	3	3.98	3
4	1.5	4	4.51	2
5	1.4	4	4.13	2
6	0.8	2	2.48	2
7	0.9	2	2.82	3
8	1.2	3	3.56	2

=== Season 3 (2013) ===
Episode No.	Rating	Share	Viewers (Millions)
1	1.2	3	4.25
2	1.0	3	3.81
3	1.2	4	3.92
4	1.0	3	3.45
5	1.1	3	3.36
6	1.1	3	3.45
7	1.1	4	3.75
8	1.2	4	3.60

== See also ==
- Extreme Makeover: Home Edition
- Extreme Makeover
