= Yugoslav krone =

Currency of the Kingdom of Serbs, Croats, and Slovenes

крyна/kruna (Serbo-Croatian); krona (Slovene)
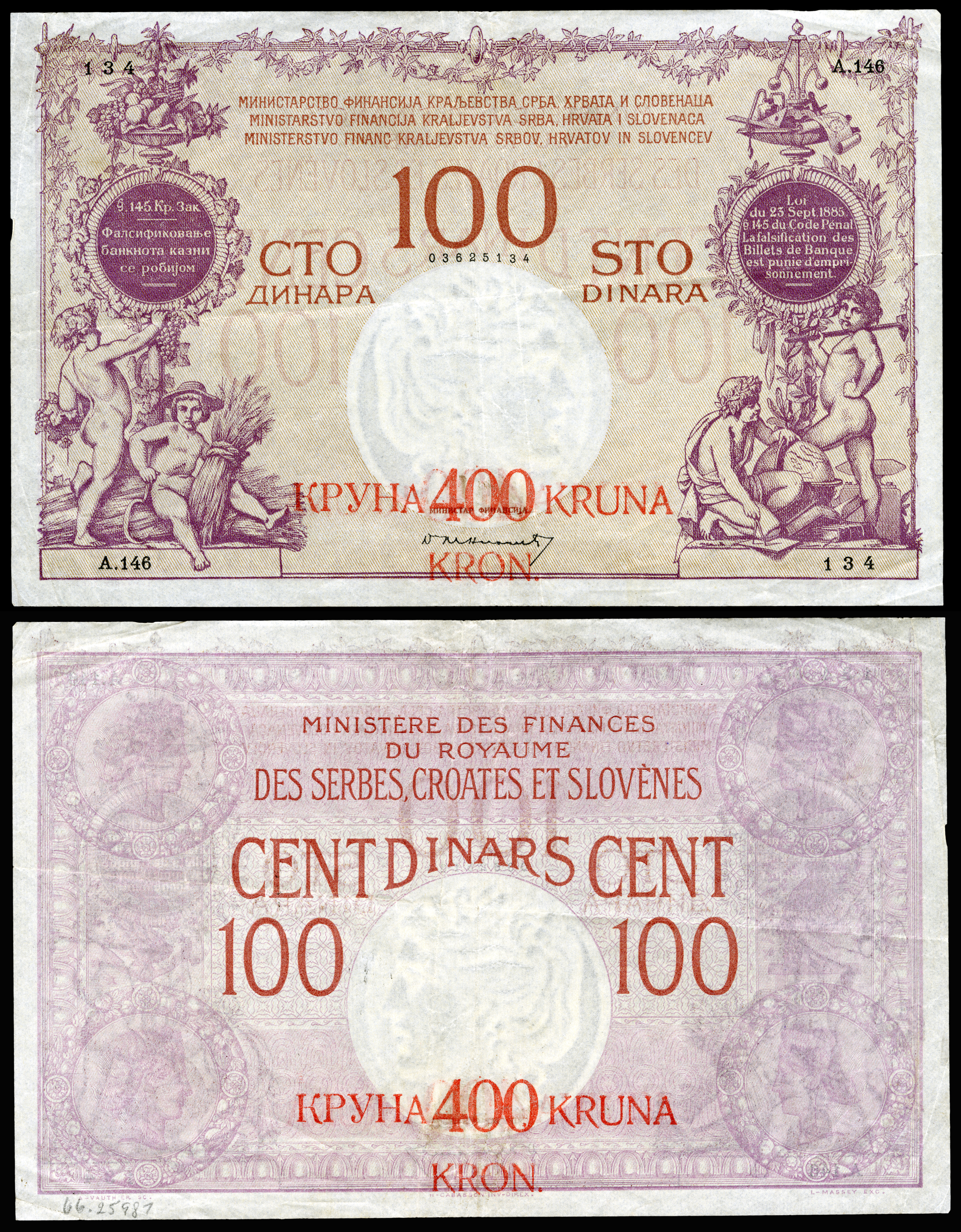
- Overprinted 400 krone on 100 dinar note

Demographics
- Date of introduction: December 1918
- Replaced: Austro-Hungarian krone
- Date of withdrawal: 1922
- Replaced by: Yugoslav dinar
- User(s): Kingdom of Serbs, Croats and Slovenes

Issuance
- Central bank: National Bank of the Kingdom of Serbs, Croats and Slovenes
- This infobox shows the latest status before this currency was rendered obsolete.

The Yugoslav krone (Serbo-Croatian: крyна / kruna; Slovene: krona) was a short-lived, provisional currency used in territories of the newly formed Kingdom of Serbs, Croats, and Slovenes (KSCS, later renamed Yugoslavia), which had previously been part of Austria-Hungary. The currency was first issued in 1919 in the form of rubber-stamped and tagged Austro-Hungarian krone notes, replacing them. In 1920, to allow the exchange of Austro-Hungarian krone and Serbian dinar notes for the new KSCS dinar, provisional, dual KSCS dinar-krone banknotes were issued with the krone value overprinted. By 1 January 1923, the provisional notes were withdrawn from circulation and replaced with notes denominated only in dinars. The Yugoslav krone's official value was one half of a Serbian dinar at its introduction and one quarter of a Serbian dinar or KSCS dinar at its withdrawal from circulation.

The decision for the KSCS to have its own Austro-Hungarian krone notes was taken to separate KSCS fiscally from other Austro-Hungarian successor states and protect the KSCS market from inflationary pressures caused by printing of krone notes abroad. In order to achieve the separation of the currency in circulation in the former Austro-Hungarian territories belonging to the KSCS from identical Austro-Hungarian krone notes in circulation in other former Austro-Hungarian territories, each note was marked by application of a rubber stamp. The stamped currency notes were also later tagged using adhesive stamps. The KSCS government withheld twenty per cent of the notes submitted for tagging as a compulsory loan to the state.

Replacement of the currency caused a persisting controversy. Serbian sources say the exchange krone at the rate of four to one Yugoslav dinar, while the Serbian dinar was simultaneously exchanged for the new Yugoslav currency at par caused no adverse effects, but Croatian historians and public perception portray the exchange rate as unjust and claim that the scheme channelled wealth to non-Serbian areas of the KSCS.

== Background ==
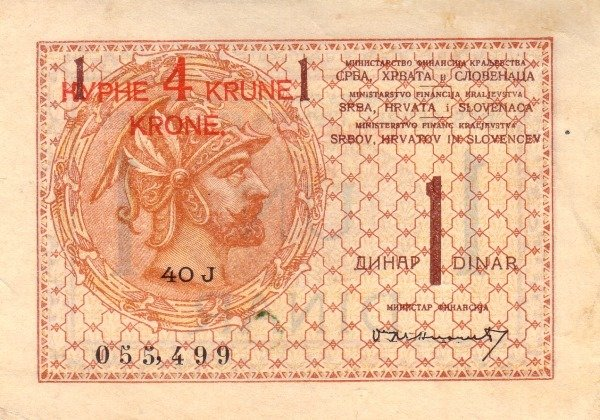

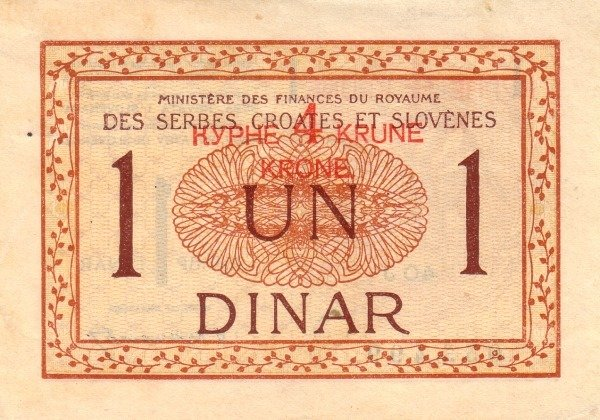
Kingdom of Serbs, Croats and Slovenes 4 krone on 1 dinar note

In the final days of World War I, Austria-Hungary disintegrated and its former territories that were mostly inhabited by South Slavs were organised into the short-lived State of Slovenes, Croats and Serbs. On 1 December 1918, this new state became a part of the Kingdom of Serbs, Croats and Slovenes through its unification with the Kingdom of Serbia that was proclaimed by Prince Regent Alexander of Serbia. Alexander then appointed the country's first prime minister. The Temporary National Representation was appointed as the new state's provisional legislative body, the bulk of legislation was enacted in the form of government decrees. At the time the kingdom was established, several currencies were in circulation in its territory; the Serbian dinar was in circulation in the former Kingdom of Serbia, and in some areas of Banat, Bačka and Baranja, and the Austro-Hungarian krone was in circulation in that empire's former territories.

Some krone notes had been circulated in Serbia since its wartime occupation. During the occupation, the population was required to exchange the Serbian dinar for the Austro-Hungarian krone as the occupation currency, but the requirement was generally ignored, so the amount in circulation there was relatively low. In Serbia, there were calls for the withdrawal of the krone notes in the entire Kingdom of Serbs, Croats and Slovenes with no compensation. These calls were based on assertions the krone was enemy money that was used to cause destruction and death in Serbia. Some politicians from the territories formerly belonging to Austria-Hungary, including Nikola Winterhalter, Vitomir Korać, Janko Šimrak, and Ivan Ancel, shared this view. The government rejected this approach, saying it would wipe out the private financial property of a large part of the population, risk an economic crisis, and be politically problematic.

The repayment of war bonds issued by Austria-Hungary during the war affected the value and stability of the Austro-Hungarian krone. The newly established states in the empire's former territories, except the Republic of German-Austria, said they would not honour any debts arising from the bonds. Austro-Hungarian Bank honoured claims under the bonds without exception by printing the required banknotes, increasing the supply of currency and thus inflation. In late 1918, the SCS finance minister Momčilo Ninčić sent a committee (Milko Brezigar, Velizar Janković, and Milan Marković) to Vienna and Budapest to find out if it was possible to stop the printing of the Austro-Hungarian krone. They also visited Prague, where the KSCS planned to order the printing of its new currency. The governor of Austro-Hungarian Bank, Ignaz Freiherr Gruber von Menninger, told the committee printing would continue to avoid fuelling a potential Bolshevik uprising in the German-Austria. The Treaty of Saint-Germain-en-Laye, which ended the war with German-Austria, was interpreted as stipulating Austro-Hungarian successor states would have to redeem Austro-Hungarian krone notes circulating in their territory, although interpretations varied.

== Marking of krone notes ==
=== Rubber stamping ===
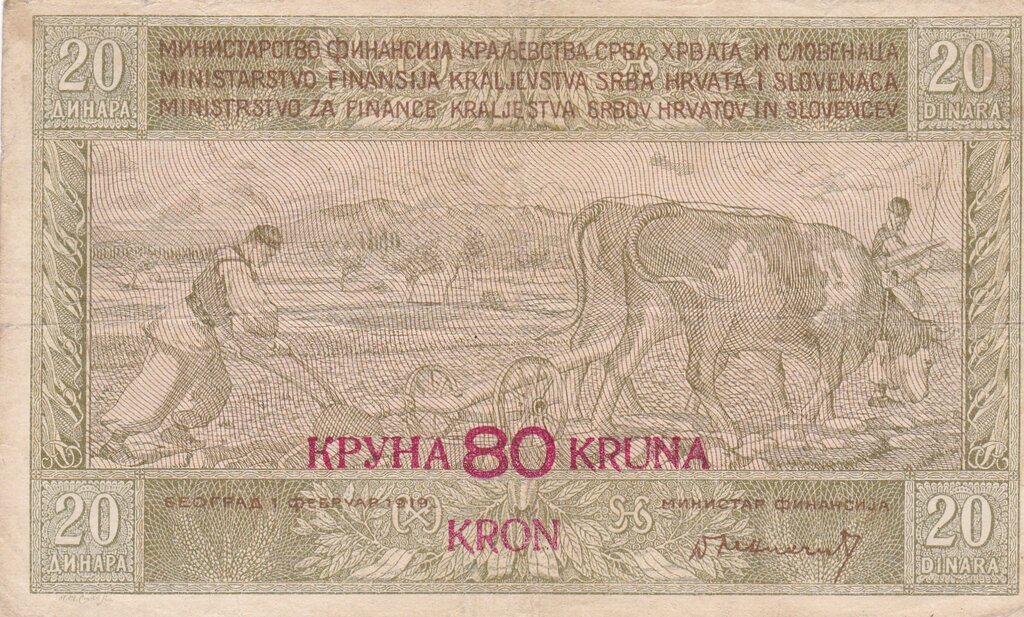

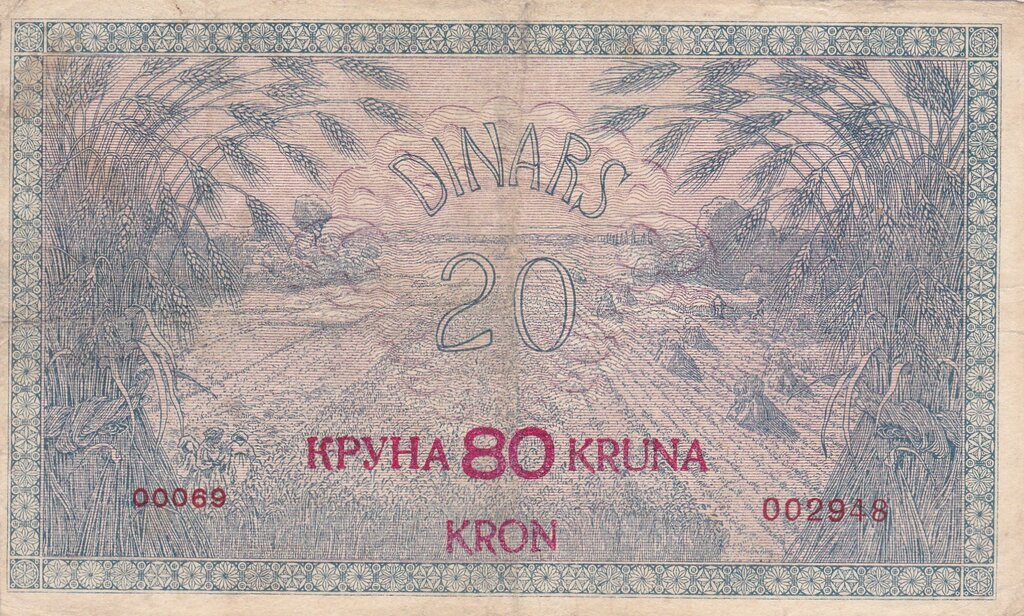
Kingdom of Serbs, Croats and Slovenes 80 krone on 20 dinar note

In December 1918, the National Council of Slovenes, Croats and Serbs, the body formally administering the former Austro-Hungarian territories within the new kingdom, started to examine ways to remove the Austro-Hungarian krone from circulation. In late 1918, economist (and later vice-governor of the National Bank of Yugoslavia) Ivo Belin proposed replacing krone with dinar at par (1:1). Belin proposed the stamping of Austro-Hungarian krone notes in circulation in the country to prevent an influx of notes from other former Austro-Hungarian territories. He proposed the stamped notes should be quickly replaced by a provisional currency, which would then be replaced by dinars issued by the national bank. Belin expected the former Austro-Hungarian territories within the new kingdom to cover the cost of replacement operations. Later government plans for the currency exchange were similarly formulated, likely influenced by Belin.

After it was determined the Austro-Hungarian krone would continue to be printed, the KSCS government ordered the stamping of krone notes circulating in the country; this decision was adopted on 12 December 1918. The order prohibited all inflow of currency exceeding 1,000 krone and all exports of krone. The move was designed to determine the amount of the currency in circulation in the kingdom while creating a separate currency, thereby preventing any currency union in the former Austro-Hungarian lands. The stamping of krone notes largely removed fears that the krone would be abolished without compensation.

Stamping was completed by 31 January 1919. It was carried out by the Ministry of Finance, commercial and savings banks, tax authorities, district and municipal government offices, military bodies, and numerous other authorised and unauthorised bodies, using rubber stamps. Rubber stamps of different shapes and inks of varying colours were used. Stamps were applied to several areas of krone notes, and had varying contents in several languages, including German, Hungarian, and Italian. This led to public perception that the stamping was poorly managed, and the stamps were easy to counterfeit. Insignificant amounts of Austro-Hungarian krone notes were smuggled into the KSCS in expectation of a more favourable exchange than elsewhere. Overall, 5.323 billion krone were stamped. The overstamped notes were Austro-Hungarian krone in denominations of 10, 20, 50, 100, and 1,000 krone.

Amount of Austro-Hungarian krone stamped by territory
Territory	Amount, million krone
Croatia-Slavonia	1949
Dalmatia	163
Banat, Bačka and Baranja	1669
Slovene Lands	603
Bosnia and Herzegovina	512
Serbia	421
Montenegro	6
TOTAL	5323

The stamping of krone banknotes in the KSCS led the government of German-Austria to consider stamping Austro-Hungarian krone in circulation there. German-Austria expected the KSCS might withhold a portion of the notes in the process of stamping. Those notes could then be taken out of circulation and used to buy assets in German-Austria as bad money, driving up prices. In early February 1919, German-Austria started stamping the krone notes in circulation in the country upon urging by Ludwig von Mises. Later that month, Czechoslovakia, another successor-state of Austria-Hungary, started stamping its krone notes.

=== Tagging ===
In addition to rubber stamping, most krone notes were tagged using special adhesive stamps. One hundred million stamps and accompanying receipt forms were printed in Vienna in exchange for three railroad goods wagons—two loaded with flour and one carrying bacon. The tagging encompassed rubber-stamped krone notes except 10 krone and smaller notes, which were exempt. The tags used on 10, 20 and 50 krone notes were multilingual—in Serbian, Croatian and Slovene—while those on the 100 and 1,000 krone notes could be in any recognized language and either Latin or Cyrillic script. Tagging was completed between 26 November 1919 and 11 January 1920. The Ministry of Finance reported 4.6 billion krone were tagged; the National Bank of Yugoslavia later said almost 5.7 billion krone were tagged. The tagging likely had financial motives; 20% of the amount tagged was withheld as a compulsory five-year loan to the government, yielding a one percent annual interest. The loan was not repaid in cash; its terms were modified several times until 1930, when it was determined the receipts may be used to pay taxes or fines. The public perceived this compulsory loan as confiscation. The government immediately returned the withheld notes to circulation.

== Interim currency ==
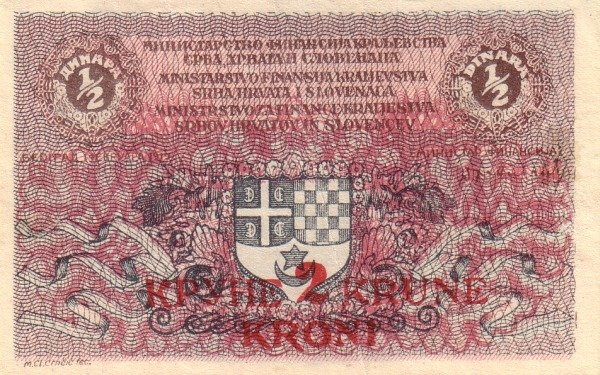

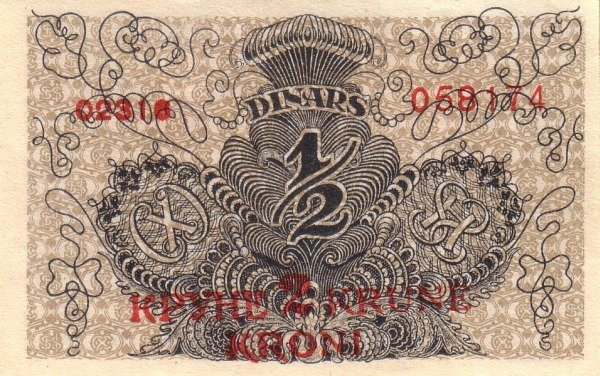
Kingdom of Serbs, Croats and Slovenes 2 krone on 1/2 dinar note

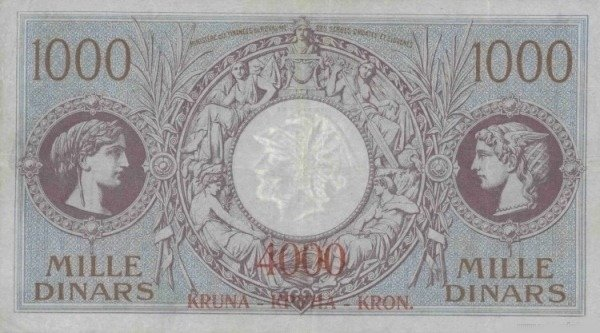

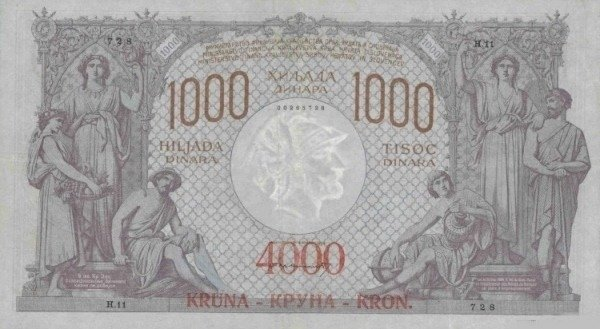
Kingdom of Serbs, Croats and Slovenes 4000 krone on 1000 dinar note

In 1919, during the period between the stamping and tagging of krone notes, finance minister Ninčić created a plan to introduce an interim currency that called for the currency to be issued directly by the state rather than a national bank. This was because the KSCS had not yet legislated a national bank into existence and Ninčić wanted to avoid delays in replacing krone notes. According to his plan, the national bank would later issue a more permanent currency in place of the provisional one. There were conflicting views on the rate at which the stamped-and-tagged krone notes would be exchanged for the new currency. There were proposals for various conversion rates of krone and Serbian dinar to the new currency, ranging from exchange at par to an exchange rate of ten krone to one dinar. The government-defined exchange rate changed over time from two krone to one dinar in late October 1918, to three krone to one dinar in mid-1919, and four krone to one dinar on 1 January 1920. The exchange rate established in 1920 was defined as the rate of the actual exchange. This rate was used, in a limited extent, to exchange krone for dinars in parts of Bačka, Banat and Baranja, where both currencies had been in circulation before the official swap.

The KSCS government decided to introduce a KSCS dinar and, on 1 February 1919, it ordered the printing of 3.5 billion dinars in Paris. The printing was delayed by a lack of printing capacity, causing the government to hire additional suppliers in Prague and Zagreb. Shortages of ink, paper, and spare parts, as well as a governmental collapse and the replacement of Ninčić with Vojislav Veljković, caused further delays. By September, only one billion dinars were printed. By November, this had increased to 2.1 billion, but only 800 million were actually delivered. When it became clear the exchange could not take place before May 1920, Belin unsuccessfully proposed exchanging krone with Serbian dinars, which could be obtained more quickly, instead of KSCS dinars. The National Bank of Serbia returned to Belgrade from its wartime seat of Marseille in February 1919. Shortly afterwards, the government proposed legislation transforming the National Bank of Serbia into the central bank of the KSCS that would issue the KSCS dinar. The change involved the issuing of additional shares of the bank, but the bank remained predominantly in Serbian ownership.

In January 1920, as the final decision on exchange of the krone notes was debated, Matko Laginja, the head of the Croatian Union—the largest Croatian party in the Temporary National Representation—renewed calls for an at-par exchange. At the same time, prominent Slovene politician Gregor Žerjav conceded to the 4:1 krone-to-dinar exchange rate but requested the krone remain a legal currency within the KSCS. On 13 January, the government made the decision on the exchange, combining the two demands with its earlier position. The new provisional notes would be simultaneously issued in dinar and krone in the ratio of 4:1, and each note would have a dinar amount and a krone amount. The government decision stated the exchange would be at par, but that was interpreted as meaning krone at par for krone and dinar at par for dinar. Thus, one stamped Austro-Hungarian krone was exchanged for one KSCS krone, and one Serbian dinar was exchanged for one KSCS dinar. Small-value (up to 10) krone notes were to remain in circulation, and government bodies would keep accounts in both dinar and krone. The national bank issued the joint dinar-krone notes that had been ordered by the state in February 1919. The dinar-krone notes were printed as dinar and overprinted with krone at the prescribed ratio. Denominations issued were 2, 4, 20, 40, 80, 400 and 4,000 krone on 1/2, 1, 5, 10, 20, 100 and 1,000 dinar. In total, 1.277 billion dinar were used for the exchange, corresponding to 5.1 billion krone. The withdrawn krone notes were stored in the Petrovaradin Fortress until they were handed to German-Austria. The dinar-krone notes were gradually replaced in 1922 with new designs without krone denominations, causing dinar to be the sole legal tender in the KSCS by 1 January 1923.

== Aftermath ==
There have been conflicting views about the effects of the introduction of the Yugoslav krone and its exchange for KSCS dinar at the rate of 4:1. The issue of the currency swap rapidly grew into a political question of whether Serbia plundered inhabitants of the former Austro-Hungarian territories within the KSCS. According to Serbian sources, there were no adverse economic consequences from the operation. Croatian historians such as Ivo Banac, Franjo Tuđman, and Ivo Goldstein, and Alojz Ivanišević said the exchange ratio was unjustified. Their views correspond to the public perception in Croatia that the currency swap was unjust or even malicious; this view has been present since 1920. Public sentiment was that the krone was intentionally depreciated and the Serbian dinar favoured. According to historian Marko Attila Hoare, the exchange caused a loss of 1.4 billion krone to the former Austro-Hungarian lands. At the same time, the exchange increased the purchasing power of the population of Serbia at the cost of the former Austro-Hungarian lands.

== Sources ==
- Becić, Ivan M. (2013). "Za dinar ili za krunu - ko je dobio, a ko izgubio?" [For the Dinar or for the Kruna — Who Won, Who Lose?]. Istorija 20. Veka (in Serbian). 31 (2). Belgrade: Institut za savremenu istoriju: 41–58. doi:10.29362/ist20veka.2013.2.bec.41-58. ISSN 0352-3160.
- Belin, Ivo (1924). "Ekonomski pregled: Pitanje honorisanja bonova izdatih pri markiranju novčanica Austrougarske Banke" [Economic Overview: The Question of Allowing of Coupons Issued During Marking Austria-Hungarian Bank’s Bank-Notes]. Nova Evropa (in Croatian). 09 (8). Zagreb: Tipografija: 240–243. ISSN 1846-2669. OCLC 1760855.
- Đozić, Hakija (2005). "Kako je Kraljevina Srba, Hrvata i Slovenaca opljačkala nekadašanje imaoce kruna Austro-Ugarske?" [How Kingdom of Serbs, Croats and Slovenes robbed the former holders of the Austro-Hungarian crown?]. Znakovi vremena - Časopis za filozofiju, religiju, znanost i društvenu praksu (in Bosnian) (28). Sarajevo: Naučnoistraživački institut Ibn Sina: 284–293. ISSN 1512-5416.
- Cuhaj, George S. (2010). Standard Catalog of World Paper Money General Issues (1368-1960) (13 ed.). Iola: Krause Publications. ISBN 978-1-4402-1293-2.
- Geiger, Vladimir; Ostajmer, Branko (2019). "Nostrifikacija i zamjena austrougarskih krunskih novčanica u Kraljevstvu Srba, Hrvata i Slovenaca (1918. - 1921.): primjer trgovišta i kotara Đakovo" [Validation and Exchange of the Austro-Hungarian Krone Notes in the Kingdom of Serbs, Croats and Slovenes (1918-1921): An Example of the Town and District of Đakovo]. Zbornik Muzeja Đakovštine (in Croatian). 14 (1). Đakovo: Muzej Đakovštine: 107–140. ISSN 2670-8841.
- Gnjatović, Dragana (2020). "Evolution of Economic Thought on Monetary Reform in the Kingdom of Serbs, Croats and Slovenes after the Great War". Balcanica (51). Belgrade: Institute for Balkan Studies: 183–205. doi:10.2298/BALC2051183G. ISSN 0350-7653.
- Hoare, Marko Attila (2024). Serbia: A Modern History. London: Hurst Publishers. ISBN 9781805261575.
- Hülsmann, Jörg Guido (2007). Mises: The Last Knight of Liberalism. Auburn: Mises Institute. ISBN 9781610163897.
- Mijatović, Boško (2014a). "Zamena austrijskih kruna za dinare 1920. godine" [The Exchange Of Austrian Crowns For Dinars In 1920]. Istorija 20. Veka (in Serbian). 32 (1). Belgrade: Institut za savremenu istoriju: 27–50. doi:10.29362/ist20veka.2014.1.mij.27-50. ISSN 0352-3160.
- Mijatović, Boško (2014b). "Zamena austrijskih kruna za dinare 1920. godine (drugi deo)" [The Exchange Of Austrian Crowns For Dinars In 1920 (Part Two)]. Istorija 20. Veka (in Serbian). 32 (2). Belgrade: Institut za savremenu istoriju: 75–89. doi:10.29362/ist20veka.2014.2.mij.75-90. ISSN 0352-3160.
- Pavlović, Marko (2018). "Problem izjednačenja zakona u Kraljevini Srba, Hrvata i Slovenaca / Jugoslaviji" [The Unification of Laws in the Kingdom of Serbs, Croats and Slovenes / Yugoslavia]. Zbornik Pravnog fakulteta u Zagrebu (in Serbian). 68 (3–4). Faculty of Law, University of Zagreb: 493–523. ISSN 0350-2058.
- Ramet, Sabrina P. (2006). The Three Yugoslavias: State-Building and Legitimation, 1918–2005. Bloomington: Indiana University Press. ISBN 978-0-253-34656-8.
- Schlesinger, Karl (1920). "The Disintegration of the Austro-Hungarian Currency". The Economic Journal. 30 (117). Oxford: Oxford University Press: 26–38. doi:10.2307/2223192. ISSN 0013-0133. JSTOR 2223192.
