= Yugoslav dinar =

Currency of Yugoslavia

Dinar
jugoslavenski dinar (Serbo-Croatian); југословенски динар (Serbo-Croatian); jugoslovanski dinar (Slovene); југословенски динар (Macedonian)
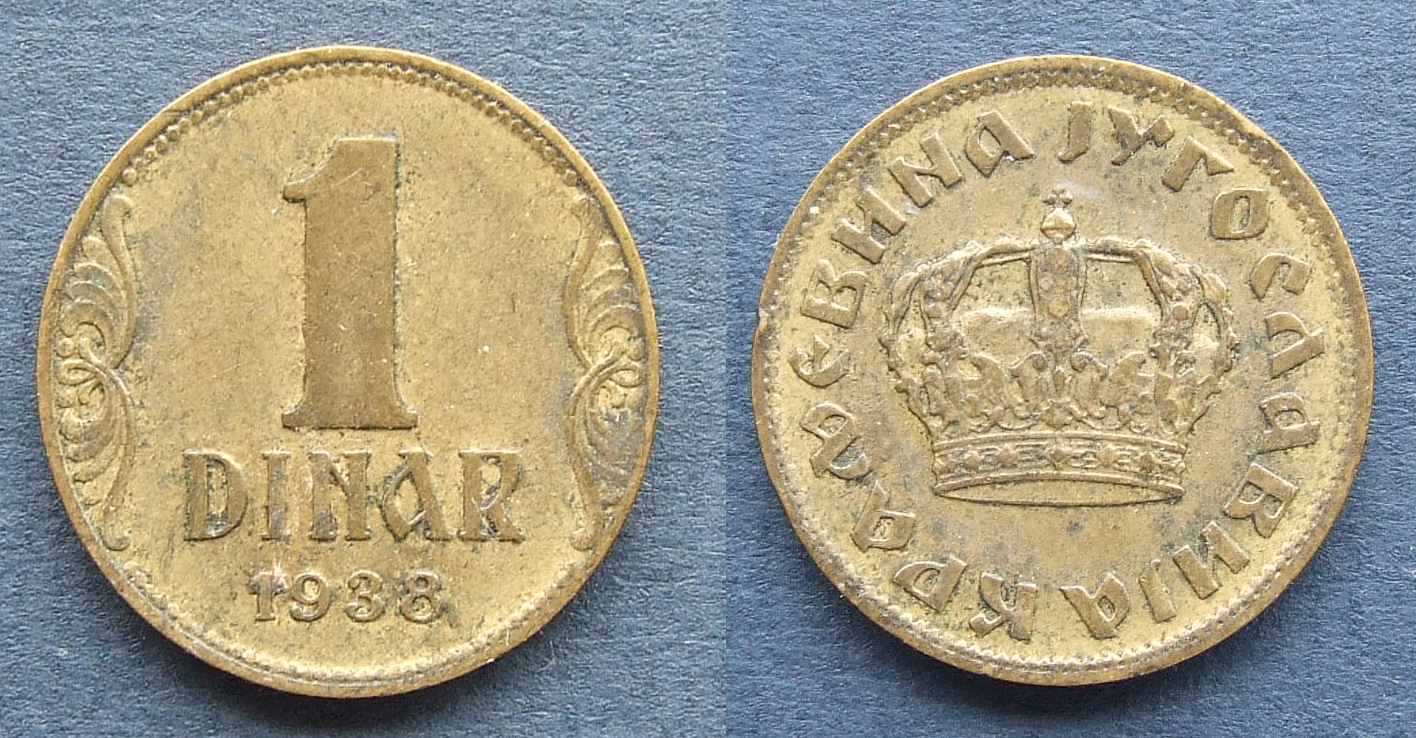
1 dinar (1938)
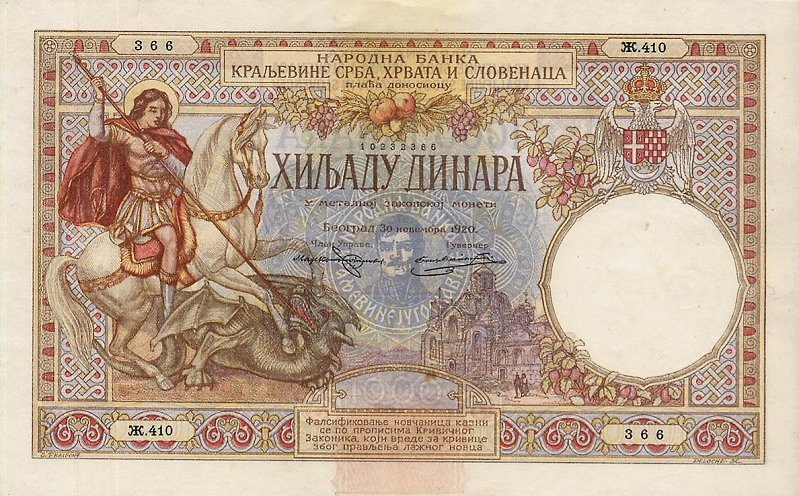
1000 dinara (1920)

ISO 4217
- Code: YUD

Units of account
- Plural: The language(s) of this currency belong(s) to the Slavic languages. There is more than one way to construct plural forms.
- Symbol: din. / дин.
- Subunit
- 1/100: para / пара

Denominations
- Banknotes: 1, 5, 10, 20, 50, 100, 200, 1000, 5000 dinara
- Coins: 1, 5, 10, 50 para, 1, 2, 5 dinara

Demographics
- Replaced: Yugoslav krone
- User(s): None, previously: Kingdom of Yugoslavia; SFR Yugoslavia

Issuance
- Central bank: National Bank of Yugoslavia
- This infobox shows the latest status before this currency was rendered obsolete.

The dinar (Serbo-Croatian Cyrillic: динар) was the currency of Yugoslavia. It was introduced in 1920 in the Kingdom of Serbs, Croats and Slovenes, which was replaced by the Kingdom of Yugoslavia, and then the Socialist Federal Republic of Yugoslavia. The dinar was subdivided into 100 para (Serbo-Croatian Cyrillic: пара). The currency replaced Yugoslav krones.

== History ==
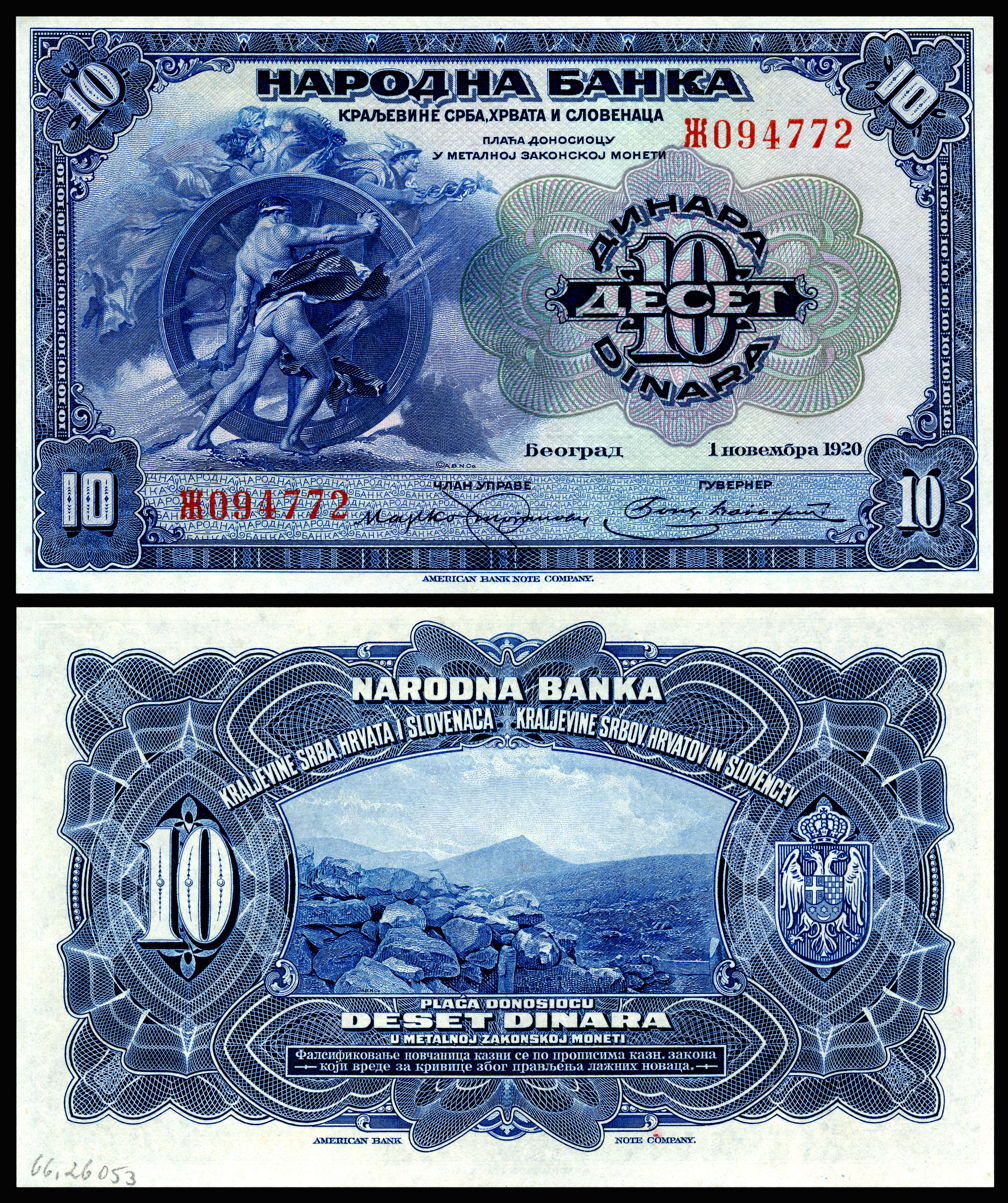
National Bank of the Kingdom of Serbs, Croats and Slovenes, 10 dinara (1920). Engraved and printed by the American Bank Note Company, allegory "Progress" engraved by Robert Savage.

=== 1920–41: dinars of the Yugoslav Kingdom ===
Until 1918, the dinar was the currency of Serbia. It then became the currency of the Kingdom of Serbs, Croats and Slovenes, circulating alongside the krone in Croatia, Slovenia and Bosnia and Herzegovina, with 1 dinar equalling 4 kronen. The first coins and banknotes bearing the name of the Kingdom of Serbs, Croats and Slovenes were issued in 1920, until which time Serbian coins and banknotes circulated. In 1929, the name of the country changed to the Kingdom of Yugoslavia and this was reflected on the currency.

In 1931, an exchange rate of 56.4 dinara to the U.S. dollar was set, which changed to 44 dinara in 1933. In 1937, a tourist exchange rate of 250 dinara to the British pound was established.

=== World War II (1941–45) ===
In 1941, Yugoslavia was invaded and split up, with the dinar remaining currency in Territory of the Military Commander in Serbia (as Serbian dinar). The kuna was introduced in Croatia and Bosnia and Herzegovina (Independent State of Croatia) at par with the dinar, whilst the Bulgarian lev, Italian lira and German Reichsmark circulated in the parts of Yugoslavia occupied by these countries.

=== 1945–65: Federation dinar (YUF) ===
In 1945, as Yugoslavia began to be reconstituted, the Yugoslav dinar replaced the Serbian dinar, Independent State of Croatia kuna and other occupation currencies, with the rates of exchange being 1 Yugoslav dinar for 20 Serbian dinara or 40 kuna.

Yugoslavia was a founding member of the International Monetary Fund. At the time, other communist countries avoided signing up to it. The dinar was initially pegged to the US dollar at a rate of 50 dinara to the dollar. By 1955, the peg had been depreciated to 300 dinars to the dollar, but this was only applicable to a limited number of transactions. For the vast majority of transactions, a system of multiple exchange rates with differing levels of government intervention applied. Depending on the transaction the system offered over 200 different exchange rates ranging from 600 or so dinara to the dollar to over 1,150. This multiple exchange rate system was abolished in 1961 and replaced with a single pegged rate of 750 dinara to the dollar.

=== 1966–89: Hard dinar (YUD) ===
Revaluations of the Yugoslav dinar
Date	Conversion Rate
29 November 1944	20
1 January 1966	100
1 January 1990	10,000

On 1 January 1966, the first of several revaluations took place, at a ratio of 100 to 1.

The revalued currency was initially pegged to the US dollar at a rate of 12.50 dinara to the dollar. In late 1971, this was revised to 17 dinara to the dollar. Following the Nixon Shock, Yugoslavia adopted a market exchange rate system. A foreign exchange market was established in Belgrade in which only banks could participate; this set the exchange rates for the entire country. This allowed the dinar to float (or perhaps more accurately, sink) more or less freely. Under this system, the exchange rate reached about 29 dinara to the dollar in 1981, 127 dinara to the dollar by 1984, and 457 dinara to the dollar by 1987.

Yugoslavia's chronic inflation was poorly managed. Its central bank monetized the debt by growing the money supply. The hyperinflation in the Socialist Federal Republic of Yugoslavia became a serious problem in the 1980s. Between 1971 and 1991, Yugoslavia's annualized inflation was 76%. Only Brazil and Zaire had higher levels of inflation.

The large denomination coins were struck in nickel brass.

=== 1990–92: Convertible dinar (YUN) ===
Coat of arms of the Socialist Federal Republic of Yugoslavia

The second revaluation took place on 1 January 1990, at a ratio of 10,000 to 1. During this period, the constituent republics began to leave the Socialist Federal Republic of Yugoslavia. Four of the six republics declared independence and issued their own currencies shortly after, and the breakup of Yugoslavia was recognized by the international community at the turn of 1992. This was the last dinar that bore the coat of arms and the name of the "Socialist Federal Republic of Yugoslavia" in multiple languages.

Country	Currency	ISO code	Date adopted	Value
Slovenia	Slovenian tolar	SIT	8 October 1991	1 dinar of 1990 (YUN)
Croatia	Croatian dinar	HRD	23 December 1991	1 dinar of 1990 (YUN)
North Macedonia	Macedonian denar	MKD	26 April 1992	1 dinar of 1990 (YUN)
Bosnia and Herzegovina	Bosnian dinar	BAD	1 July 1992	1 dinar of 1992 (YUR)
FR Yugoslavia	Yugoslav dinar in Serbia and Montenegro	YUR	1 July 1992	1 dinar of 1992 (YUR)

Serbian enclaves in Bosnia and Herzegovina and in occupied territories in Croatia also issued currencies in dinar, equivalent to and revalued together with the Yugoslav dinar. These were the Krajina dinar and the Republika Srpska dinar. The Yugoslav dinar in the Federal Republic of Yugoslavia was affected by hyperinflation in Serbia and Montenegro.

== Coins ==
=== 1920 dinar ===
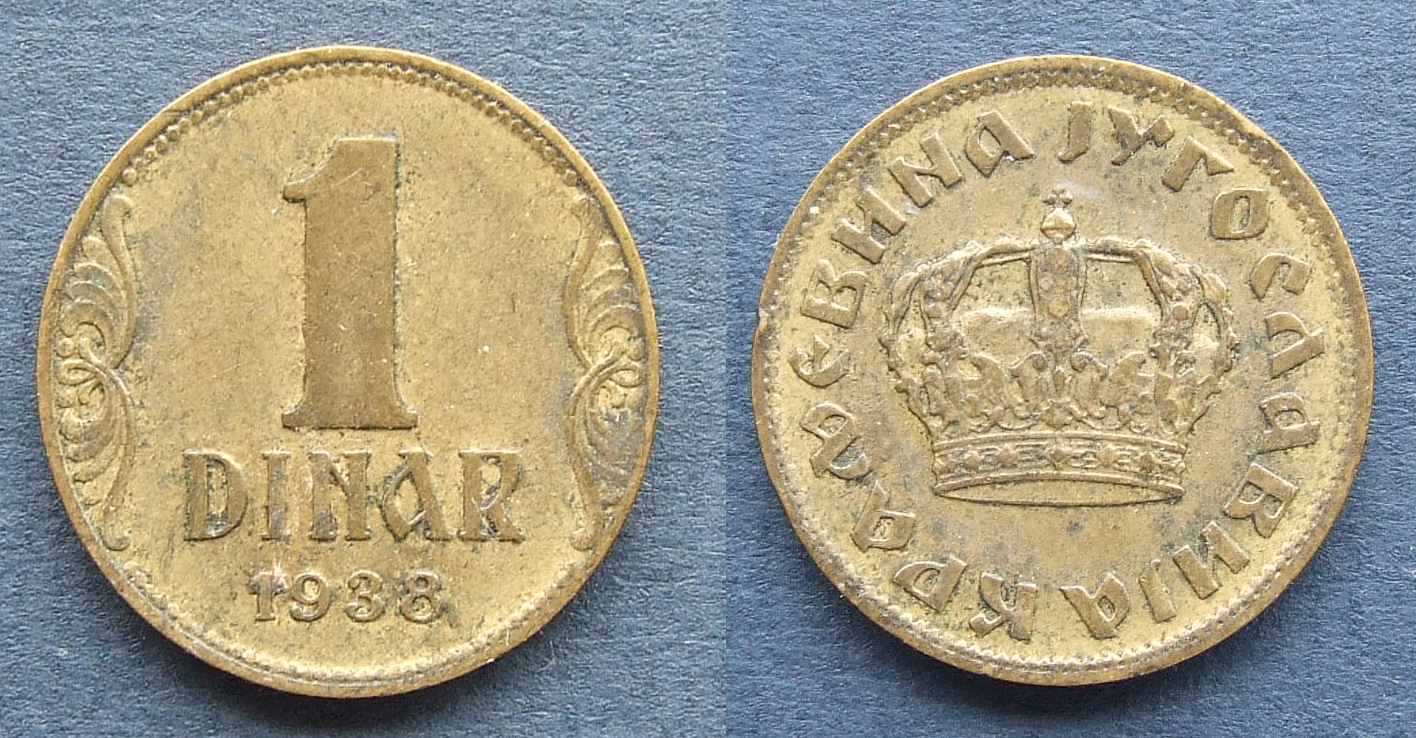
1 Dinar 1938

In 1920, the first coins were minted in the name of the Kingdom of Serbs, Croats and Slovenes. They were zinc 5 and 10 para and nickel-bronze 25 para. These were followed, in 1925, by nickel-bronze 50 para, 1 and 2 dinara. From 1931, coins were minted in the name of Yugoslavia, starting with silver 10 and 20 dinara, followed by silver 50 dinara in 1932. In 1938, aluminium-bronze 50 para, 1 and 2 dinara, nickel 10 dinara and reduced size, silver 20 and 50 dinara were introduced. These were the last coins issued before the Second World War.

=== 1945 dinar ===
In 1945, zinc 50 para, 1, 2 and 5 dinara were introduced, followed in 1953 by aluminium coins for the same denominations. In 1955, aluminium-bronze 10, 20 and 50 dinara were added.

=== 1966 dinar ===
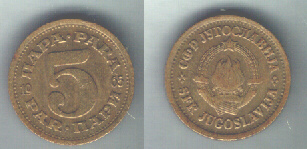
5 para coin, 1965, front and reverse

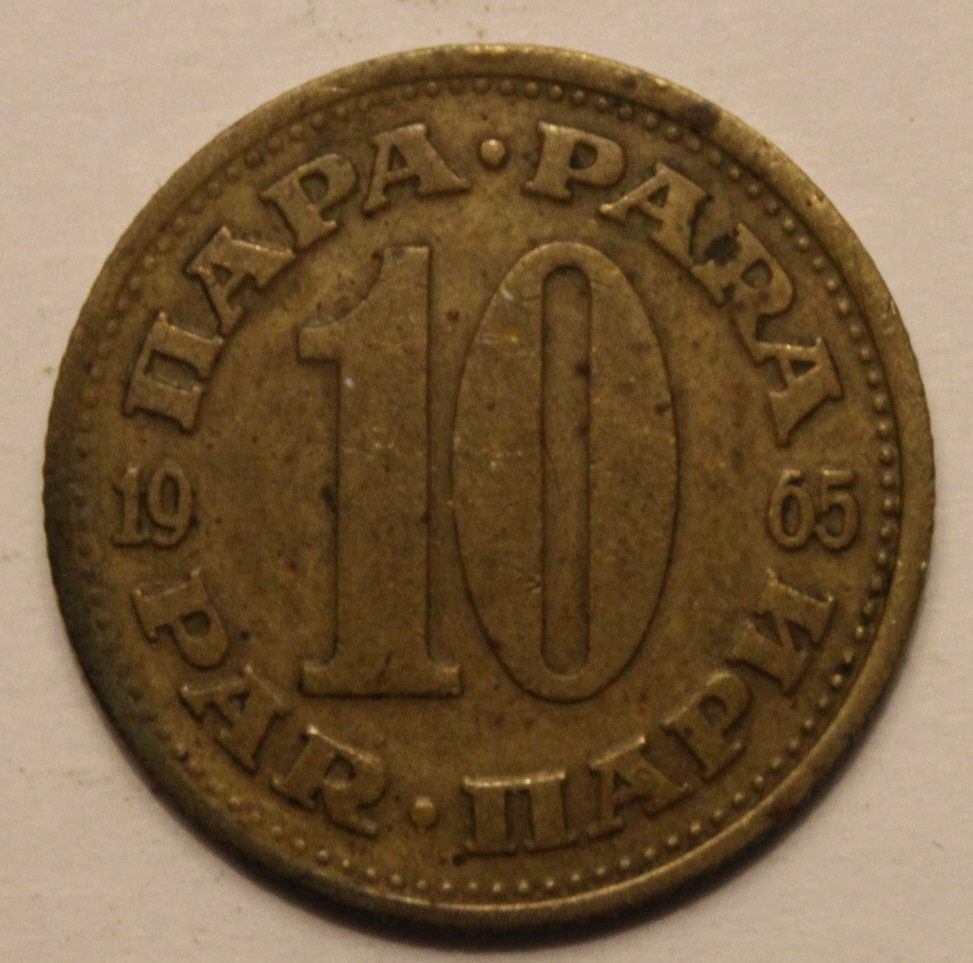
10 para coin, 1965, front

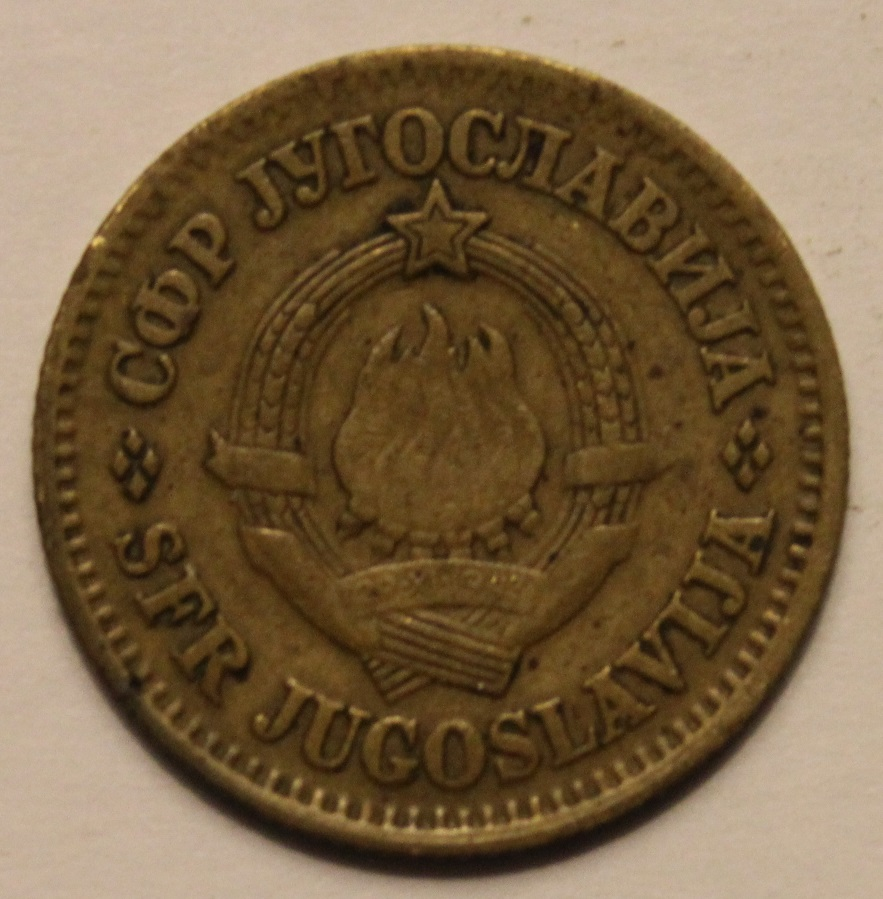
10 para coin, 1965, reverse

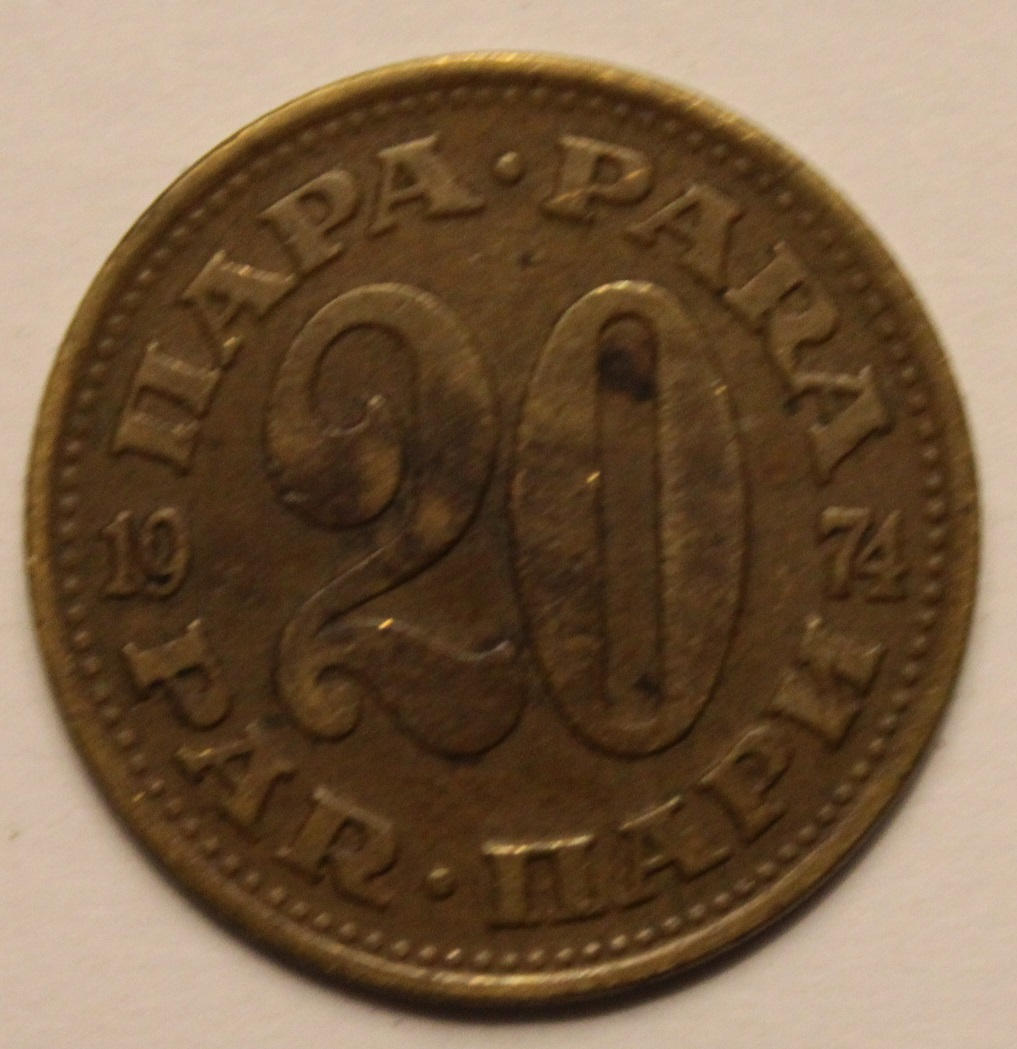
20 para coin, 1974, front

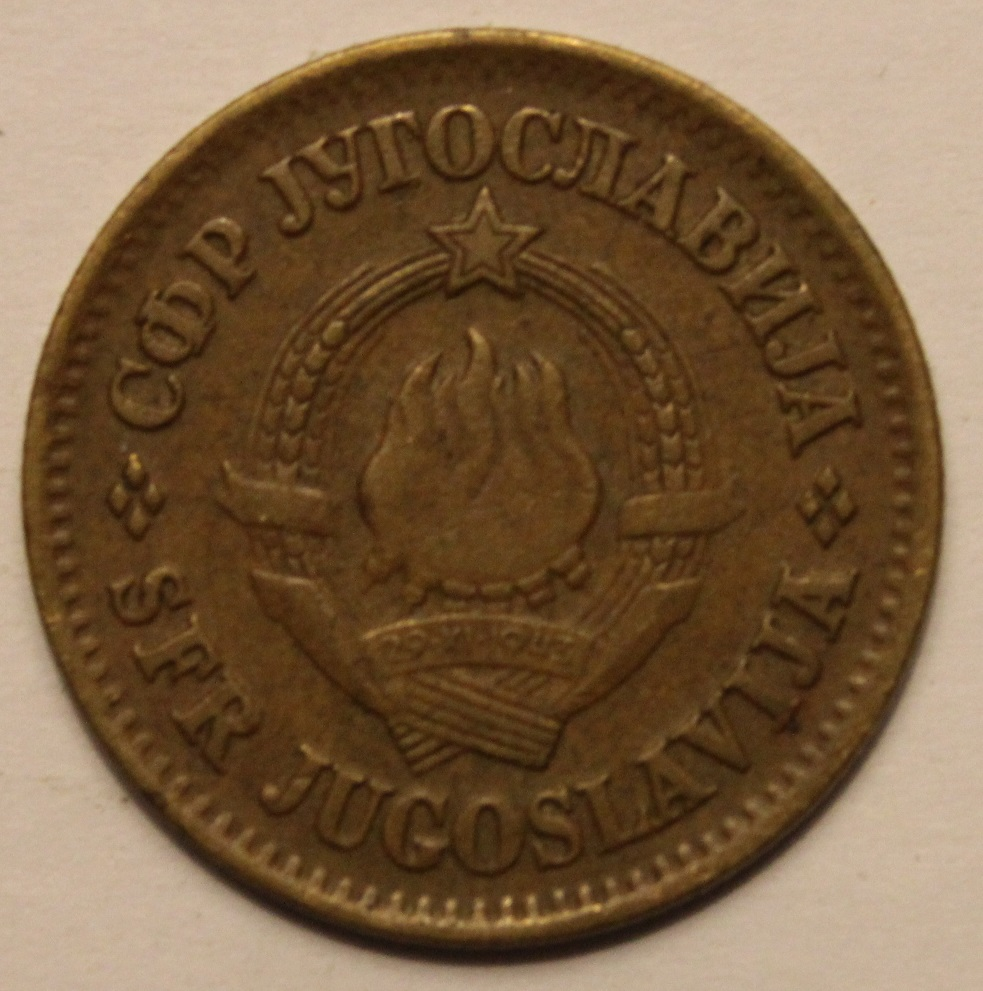
20 para coin, 1974, reverse

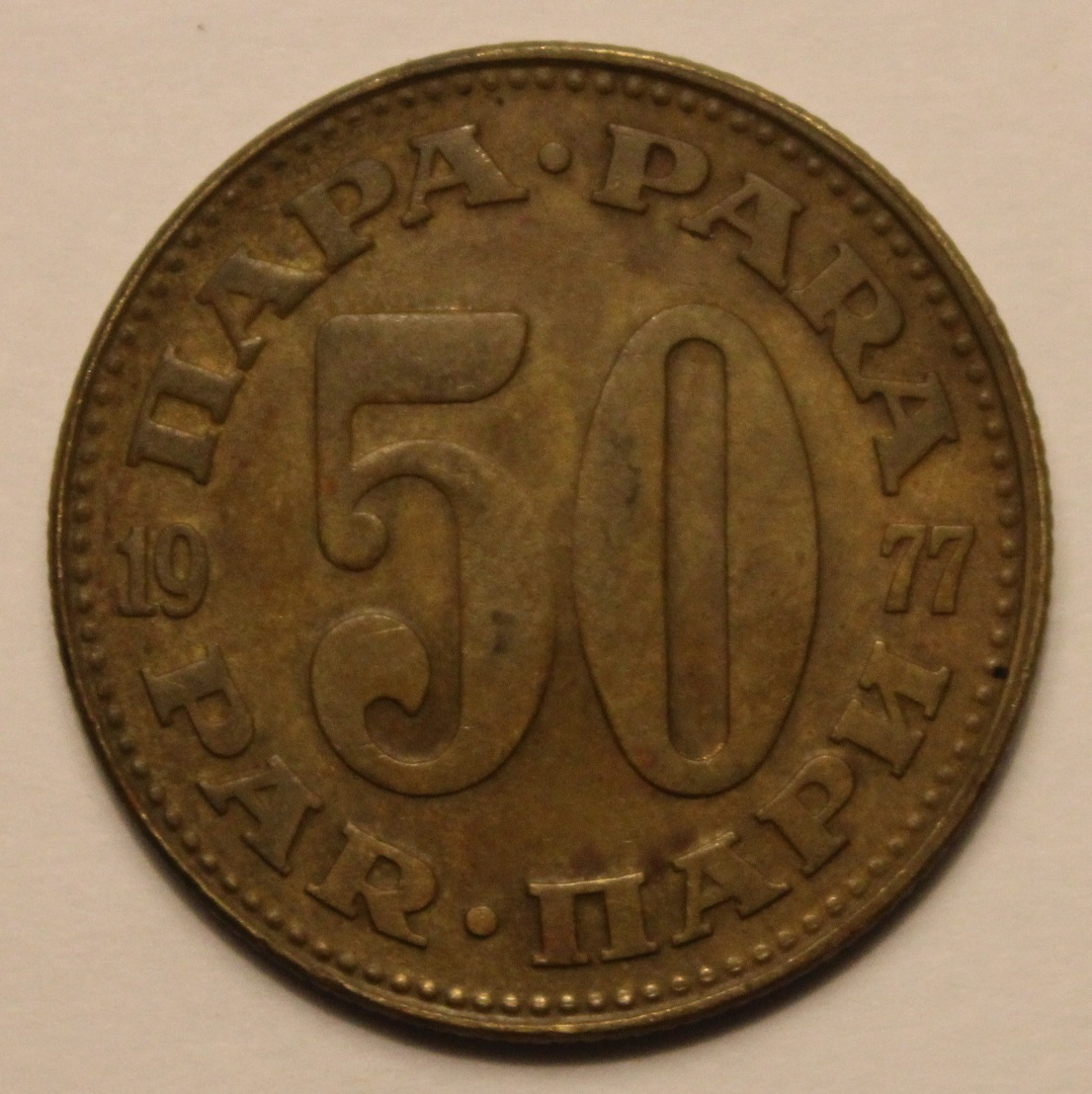
50 para coin, 1977, front

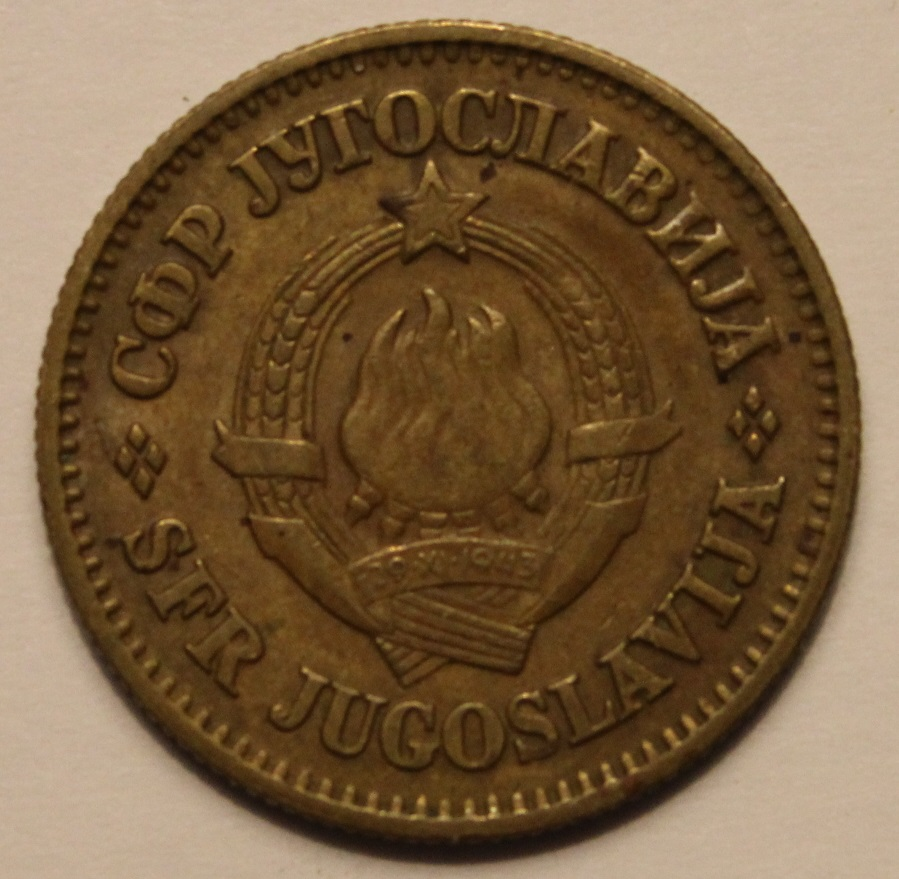
50 para coin, 1977, reverse

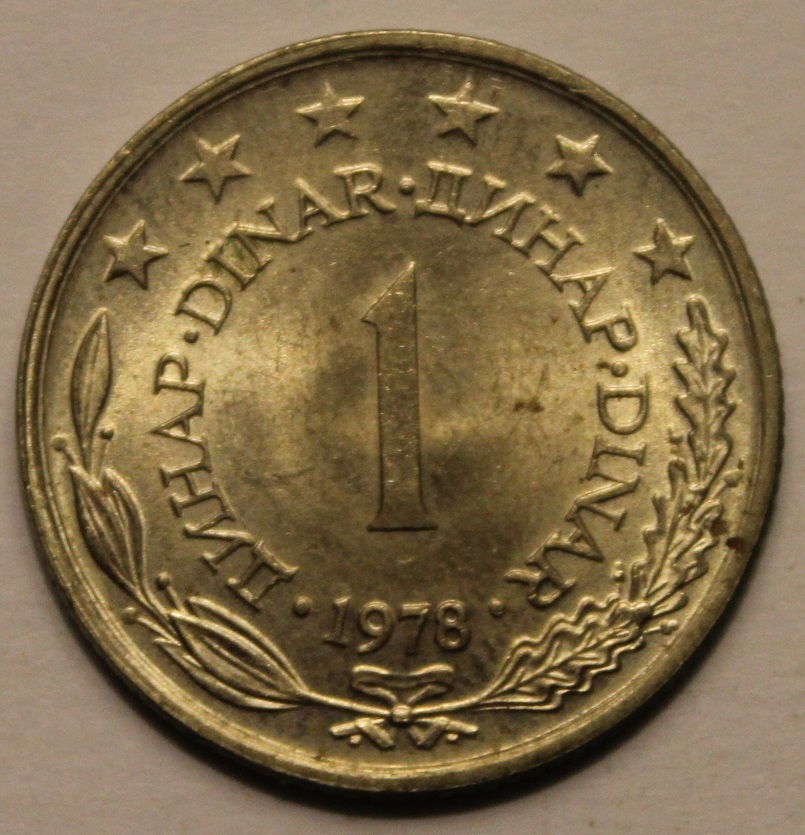
1 dinar coin, 1978, front

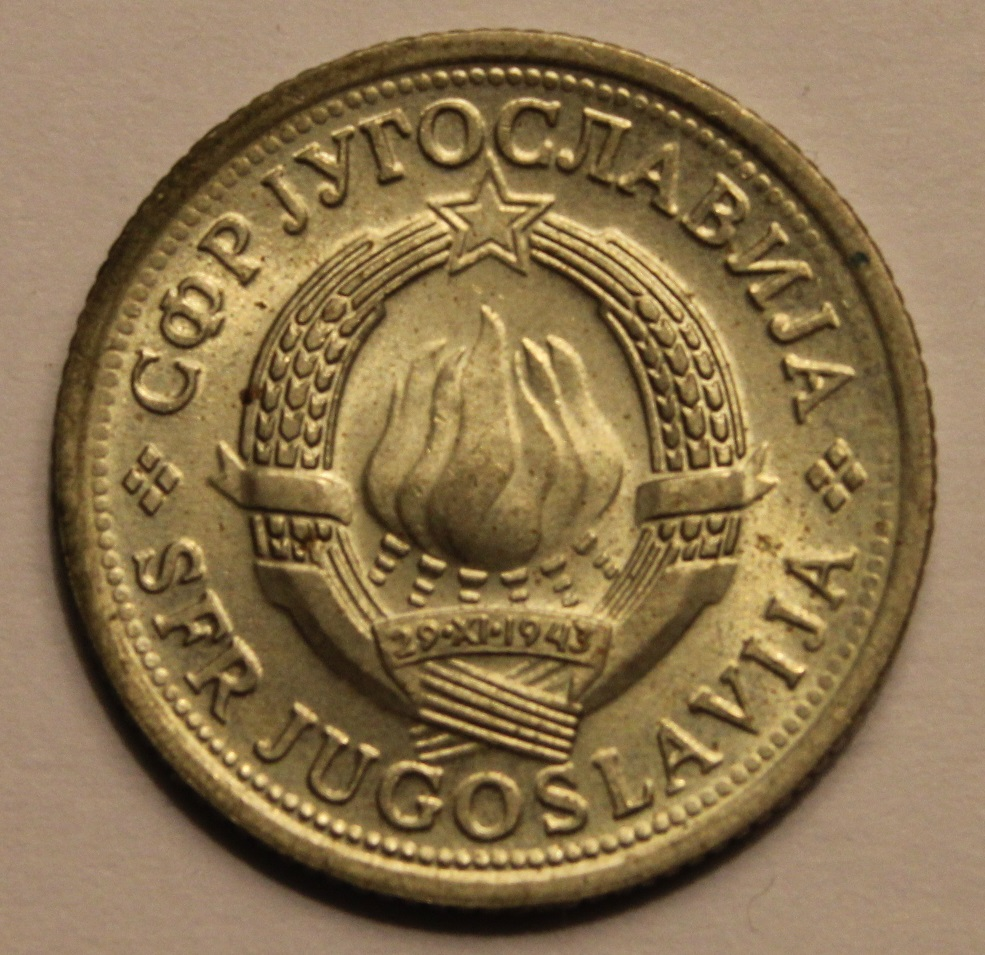
1 dinar coin, 1978, reverse

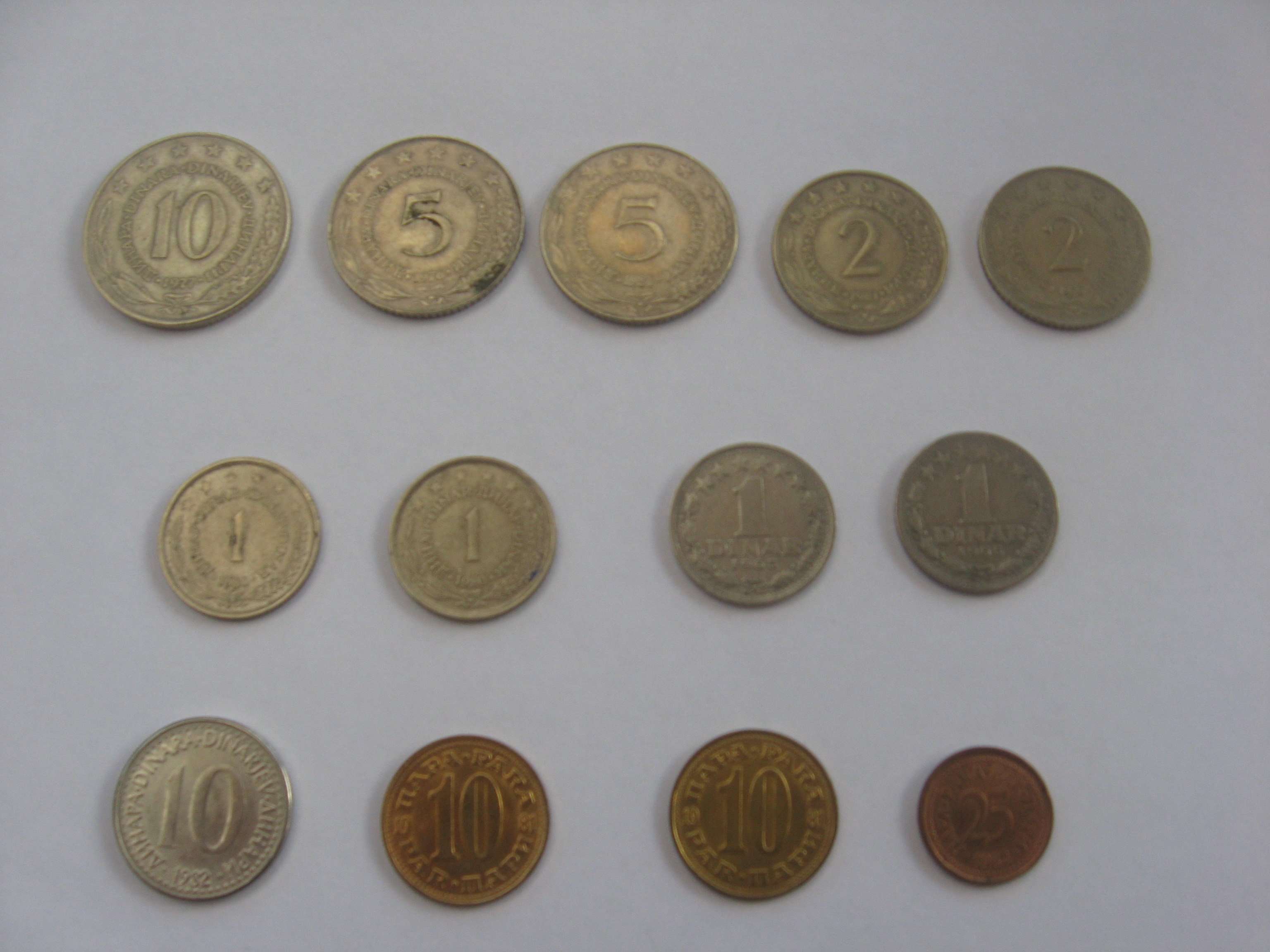
additional assorted coins, front

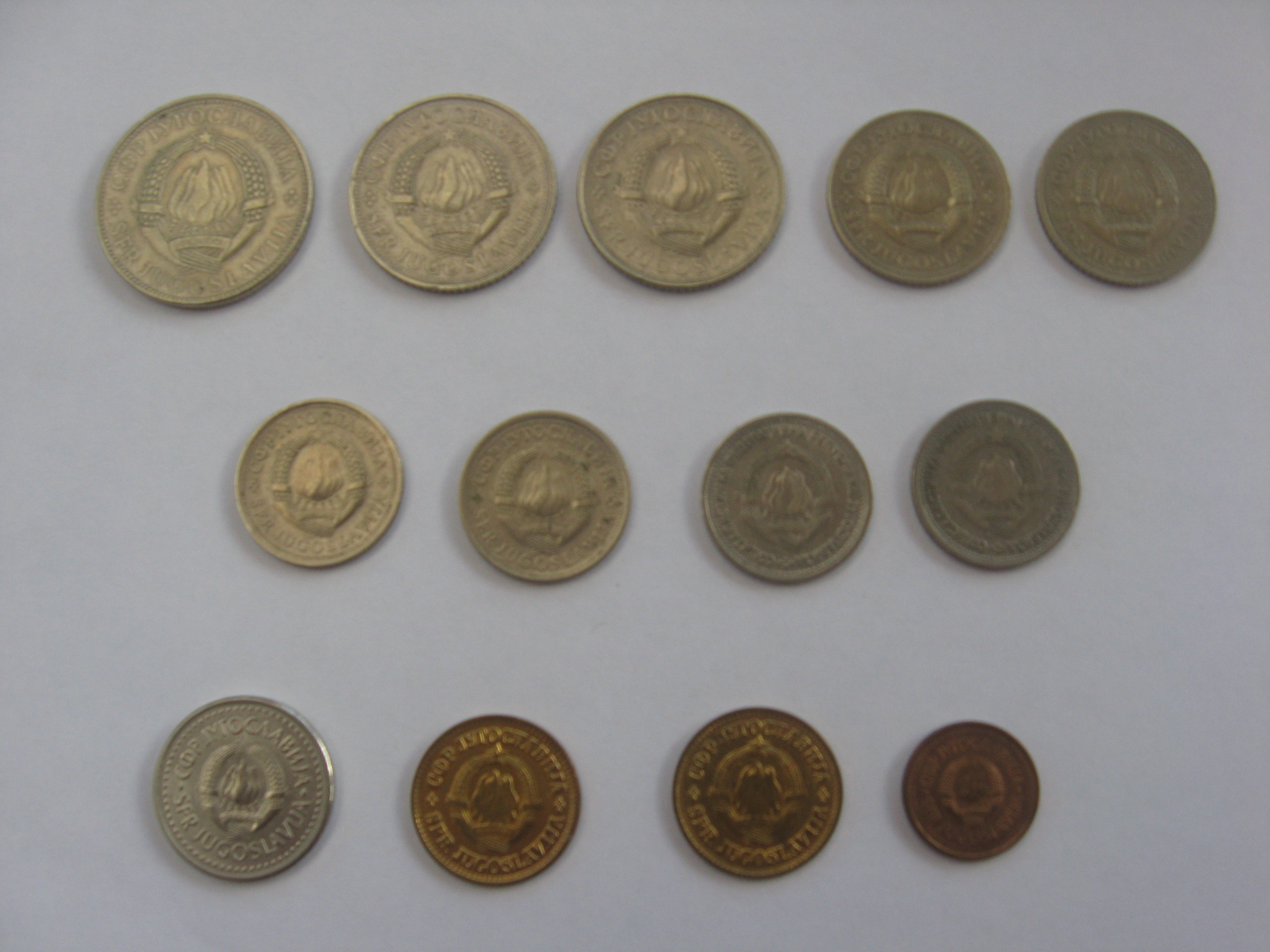
additional assorted coins, reverse

In 1966, brass 5, 10, 20 and 50 para, and cupro-nickel 1 dinar coins (dated 1965) were introduced. In 1971, nickel-brass 2 and 5 dinara were introduced, followed by cupro-nickel 10 dinara in 1976. Production of 5, 10 and 20 para coins ceased in 1981, with bronze 25 and 50 para being introduced the following year. Nickel-brass 20, 50 and 100 dinara were introduced in 1985 and production of all coins less than 10 dinara stopped the next year. In 1988, brass 10, 20, 50 and 100 dinara were introduced. These four coins were issued until 1989.

=== 1990 dinar ===
In 1990, coins for 10, 20 and 50 para, 1, 2 and 5 dinara were introduced. Most denominations ceased production in 1991.

The highest two denominations were minted in small numbers in 1992.

== See also ==
- Economy of the Socialist Federal Republic of Yugoslavia
- Alija Sirotanović

== Sources ==
- Cuhaj, George S. (2010). Standard Catalog of World Paper Money General Issues (1368-1960) (13 ed.). Krause Publications. ISBN 978-1-4402-1293-2.
- Krause, Chester L.; Clifford Mishler (1991). Standard Catalog of World Coins: 1801–1991 (18th ed.). Krause Publications. ISBN 0873411501.
- Pick, Albert (1994). Bruce, Colin R. II; Shafer, Neil (eds.). Standard Catalog of World Paper Money: General Issues (7th ed.). Krause Publications. ISBN 0-87341-207-9.
- Pick, Albert (1996). Bruce, Colin R. II; Shafer, Neil (eds.). Standard Catalog of World Paper Money: General Issues to 1960 (8th ed.). Krause Publications. ISBN 0-87341-469-1.
- Yugoslavia n banknotes at Infotech 2003
