= Extreme Makeover =

American reality television program

- Genre: Reality television
- Created by: Howard Schultz
- Directed by: Paul Miller, Shanda Sawyer
- Presented by: Sam Saboura
- Country of origin: United States
- Original language: English
- No. of seasons: 4
- No. of episodes: 54 (52 aired, 2 unaired)

Production
- Production companies: Lighthearted Entertainment; Greengrass Productions

Original release
- Network: ABC
- Release: December 11, 2002 – July 16, 2007

Related
- Extreme Makeover: Home Edition Extreme Weight Loss; Extreme Makeover: Wedding Edition

Extreme Makeover is an American reality television series that premiered on ABC in December 2002. Created by Howard Schultz, the show depicts ordinary men and women undergoing "extreme makeovers" involving plastic surgery, exercise regimens, hairdressing, and wardrobing. Each episode ends with the participants' return to their families and friends, who have not been allowed to see the incremental changes during the participants' absence, and showing their reactions. The show was cancelled in July 2007.

A spin-off series, Extreme Makeover: Home Edition, debuted in February 2004. Another spin-off, Extreme Makeover: Weight Loss Edition, premiered in May 2011, though in May 2013 the show removed the Extreme Makeover branding and was renamed Extreme Weight Loss. The show was cancelled in September 2015.

== Episodes ==
=== Series overview ===
Season	Episodes	Originally aired	
Season	Episodes	First aired	Last aired
1	6	December 11, 2002	May 21, 2003
2	23	September 18, 2003	July 21, 2004
3	19	September 23, 2004	July 14, 2005
4	4	October 20, 2006	July 16, 2007

=== Season 1 (2002–2003) ===
No.	Title	Original release date
1	"Stephanie & Luke"	December 11, 2002
2	"Kine & Tammy"	April 23, 2003
3	"David & Melissa"	April 30, 2003
4	"Amy & John"	May 7, 2003
5	"Karen & Sandra"	May 14, 2003
6	"Evelyn & Sharon"	May 21, 2003

=== Season 2 (2003–2004) ===
No.	Title	Original release date
7	"Caroline & Catherine & Dan"	September 18, 2003
8	"Jennifer & Peggy"	September 25, 2003
9	"Lori & Peter"	October 3, 2003
10	"Dana & Jackie"	October 10, 2003
11	"Liane & Paula"	October 16, 2003
12	"Kenna & Michelle"	October 23, 2003
13	"Candace & John"	October 31, 2003
14	"Sarah & Liz"	November 6, 2003
15	"Deshante & Pam"	November 13, 2003
16	"Autumn & Jeff"	November 26, 2003
17	"Jeff & Tammy"	December 11, 2003
18	"Angela & Cynthia"	January 8, 2004
19	"Arthur & Kim"	January 22, 2004
20	"Michael & Susan"	February 5, 2004
21	"Nellie & Regina"	February 16, 2004
22	"Battle of the Bulge - Part 1"	February 19, 2004
23	"Battle of the Bulge - Part 2"	March 26, 2004
24	"Amanda & Patrick"	March 11, 2004
25	"Jerry & Manu"	March 17, 2004
26	"James & Kacie"	April 14, 2004
27	"Kristina & Mike"	April 28, 2004
28	"Marilynda & Monika"	May 6, 2004
29	"Frances & Jennie & Kathryn"	July 21, 2004

== Nielsen ratings ==
Season	Episodes	Timeslot (EDT)	Season Premiere	Season Finale	TV Season	Rank	Viewers (in millions)
1	6	Wednesday 8:00	December 11, 2002	May 21, 2003	2002-2003	#41	10.80
2	23	Thursday 9:00 Wednesday 10:00	September 18, 2003	July 21, 2004	2003-2004	#133 #56	5.48; 9.83
3	20	Thursday 8:00 Thursday 9:00	September 23, 2004	July 14, 2005	2004-2005	#109 #116	6.19; 5.64
4	6 (2 unaired)	Friday 8:00 Monday 9:00	October 20, 2006	July 16, 2007	2006-2007	#175	4.85

== Controversy ==
Extreme Makeover received criticism on the grounds it was reinforcing unachievable body image goals, valuing beauty over other attributes like behaviour, and implying that idealized beauty can only be achieved by cosmetic surgeons. The show was considered to potentially contribute to eating disorders and exercise addiction among people who could not afford surgery to improve their appearance, and to be part of a growing culture of normalizing cosmetic surgery and encouraging unrealistic surgery expectations. In Canada, some cosmetic surgeons caused controversy and drew accusations of unethical marketing after using contests to attract clients, in a move that was considered to be fuelled partly by the popularity of Extreme Makeover.

=== Deleese Williams lawsuit ===
Extreme Makeover faced controversy after contestant Deleese Williams' makeover was canceled. Williams applied as a contestant on the show and both she and her family were interviewed for an episode in January 2004. When asked questions about Williams, her family initially responded only with positive comments, though producers repeatedly encouraged them to say negative things about her appearance; the intention was to compare the negative comments to their reaction after Williams' surgery was complete. Williams was in the next room listening; her shock at hearing the comments was filmed as part of the intended episode. The night before the surgery, however, Williams was informed the procedures had been canceled on the grounds that her estimated recovery time did not fit with the filming schedule. After the surgery was canceled, Williams' sister Kellie McGee suffered from guilt for making the negative comments; she died from an intentional drug overdose in May 2004. Williams sued for emotional damages; the case was settled out of court.
