= Independent State of Croatia kuna =

Former currency of Croatia

Kuna Nezavisne Države Hrvatske (Croatian)
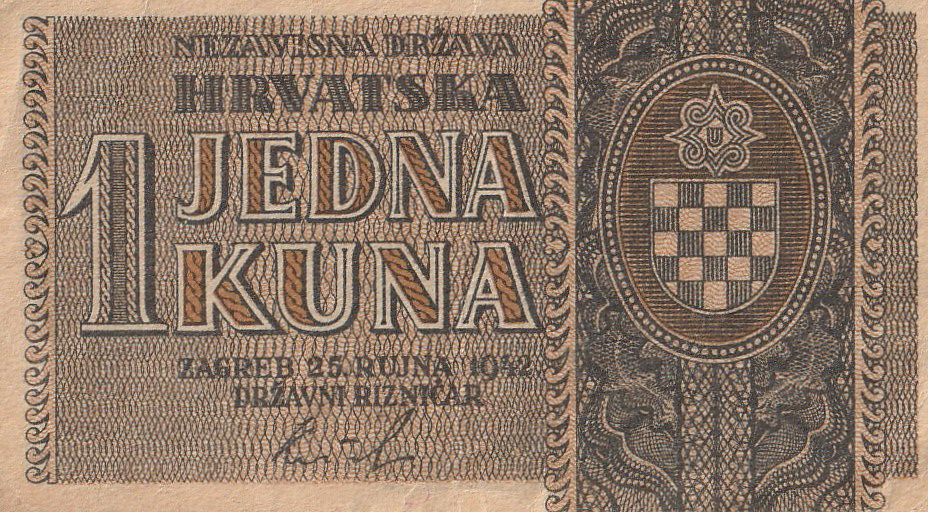

Units of account
- Plural: kune (2-4) kuna (higher amounts, nominative); The language(s) of this currency belong(s) to the Slavic languages. There is more than one way to construct plural forms.
- Symbol: Kn
- Subunit
- 1/100: banica

Denominations
- Banknotes: 50 banica, 1, 2, 10, 20, 50, 100, 500, 1000, 5000 kuna
- Coins: 1, 2 kuna

Demographics
- Date of introduction: 26 July 1941
- Replaced: Yugoslav dinar
- Date of withdrawal: 30 June to 9 July 1945
- Replaced by: Yugoslav dinar
- User(s): None, previously: Independent State of Croatia

Issuance
- Central bank: Croatian State Bank (Hrvatska državna banka)
- This infobox shows the latest status before this currency was rendered obsolete.

The kuna (Croatian pronunciation: [kǔːna]; sign: Kn) was the currency of the Independent State of Croatia from 1941 until 1945. This kuna was subdivided into 100 banica. It was preceded and replaced by the Yugoslav dinar.

== Name ==
The word kuna means "marten" in Croatian and the same name is used for the modern Croatian kuna currency, which was later replaced with the euro.

== History ==
The Croatian kuna was introduced in the Independent State of Croatia on 26 July 1941. Italian lira and German Reichsmark were printed parallel to the kuna and in occupied countries, but were not legal tender in Nazi Germany. The kuna replaced the Yugoslav dinar at par and was fixed to the Reichsmark with dual exchange rates, one fixed at 20 kuna = 1 RM, the other a state-stimulated rate of:

- 31 December 1941 - 25.00 Kn = 1 ℛℳ
- 31 December 1942 - 37.50 Kn = 1 ℛℳ
- 31 December 1943 - 40.00 Kn = 1 ℛℳ
- 31 December 1944 - 80.00 Kn = 1 ℛℳ
- 6 May 1945 - 120.00 Kn = 1 ℛℳ

The kuna was withdrawn from circulation from 30 June to 9 July 1945 and replaced by the 1944 issue of the Yugoslav dinar at a rate of 40 kuna = 1 dinar.

== Banknotes ==
Kuna banknotes were introduced by the government in 1941, in denominations of 10, 50, 100, 500 and 1000 kuna. These were followed in 1942 by notes for 50 banicas and 1 and 2 kunas. In 1943, the Croatian State Bank introduced 100, 1000 and 5000 kuna notes. The notes were printed in Germany by the Giesecke+Devrient.

Denomination	Obverse image	Reverse image	Main colour
50 banica 44 × 80 mm			White and light brown
kn 1 81 × 44 mm			Dark blue and brown
kn 2 81 × 44 mm			Dark blue, red and brown
kn 10 135 × 68 mm			Olive green
kn 20 140 × 64 mm			Brown
kn 50 140 × 75 mm			Brown and red
kn 100 150 × 80 mm			Blue and green
kn 500 157 × 84 mm			Purple
kn 1,000 137 × 68 mm			Dark brown, yellow and green
kn 5,000 180 × 95 mm			Red-brown and yellow

== Coins ==
Zinc coins were issued in denominations of 1 and 2 kuna in 1941. Circulations of the 1 kuna coin were insignificant which made the coin itself extremely rare. One gold coin with two separate designs valued at 500 kuna was minted in 1941. It consisted of 9.95 grams of .900 fine gold, however it never entered circulation.

== Competing issues ==
Notes were also issued by Yugoslav partisan groups. These included the Zagreb Government Region Anti-Fascist Authority and the State Anti-Fascist Council for the National Liberation of Croatia, commonly abbreviated as ZAVNOH. The Zagreb Government Region issued notes for 500, 1000, 5000, 10,000 and 50,000 kunas. The ZAVNOH issued notes in 1943, denominated in both dinars and kunas, for 100, 500, 1000, 5000, 10,000 and 100,000 kunas/dinars. Notes for 100, 500 and 1000 liras were also issued without indication as to the value in kunas.

== See also ==
- Croatian kuna

Independent State of Croatia kuna
Preceded by: Yugoslav 1918 dinar Reason: establishment of a pro-Axis puppet state	Currency of Independent State of Croatia; 1941 – 1945	Succeeded by: Yugoslav 1944 dinar Reason: reunification of Yugoslavia as a result of World War II; Ratio: 1 dinar = 40 kuna
