= The Moment of Truth (American game show) =

American game show

- Genre: Game show
- Created by: Howard Schultz
- Based on: Nada más que la verdad by Howard Schultz
- Directed by: Ron de Moraes
- Presented by: Mark L. Walberg
- Narrated by: Mitch Lewis
- Composer: William Kevin Anderson
- Country of origin: United States
- Original language: English
- No. of seasons: 3 (1 unaired)
- No. of episodes: 38 (15 unaired)

Production
- Executive producer: Howard Schultz
- Production location: CBS Studio Center, Studio City, CA
- Running time: 60 minutes (inc. commercials)
- Production company: Lighthearted Entertainment

Original release
- Network: Fox
- Release: January 23 – August 28, 2008

The Moment of Truth is an American game show based on the Nada más que la verdad format ("Nothing but the Truth"). Contestants answer a series of 21 increasingly personal and embarrassing questions to receive cash prizes. The show was hosted by Mark L. Walberg and ran on Fox from January 23 to August 28, 2008.

On February 1, 2008, Fox ordered an additional 13 episodes of the show, bringing its episode order to 23. It was supposed to be on Fox's fall lineup, but was pushed back to make room for Fox's new game show Hole in the Wall, as well as the season finale of So You Think You Can Dance.

== Format ==
Tier	Questions	Prize Amount
1	6	$10,000
2	5	$25,000
3	4	$100,000
4	3	$200,000
5	2	$350,000
6	1 (Test #2)	$500,000

Prior to the show, a contestant is administered a polygraph exam and asked 100 yes-or-no questions (50 questions in season one)—many of which are asked again in front of the studio audience during the actual taping of the program. Without knowing the results of the polygraph, they are asked 21 of those same questions again on the program, each becoming progressively more personal in nature. If the contestant answers according to the polygraph results, they move on to the next question; however, should a contestant lie in their answer (as determined by the polygraph) or simply refuse to answer a question after it has been asked, the game ends. If they give a false answer before the $25,000 level of questions, they leave with nothing; after the $25,000 level, if a false answer is given, the contestant leaves with $25,000 (during the first season, a false answer on any level caused the player to leave with nothing). For each tier of questions answered correctly, the contestant wins the corresponding amount of money. A contestant may stop at any time before any question is asked and collect their earnings, but once they hear a question, they must answer it or lose the game. Answering all 21 questions truthfully, as determined by the polygraph results, wins the jackpot of $500,000.

After question 20, if the contestant chooses to play for the jackpot, the host will escort the contestant off stage and the contestant will do another polygraph exam with three completely new questions, one of which will be chosen as question 21. Additionally, the button (see below) is not allowed to be used on the 21st question. The contestant must play question 21 after it is revealed to them and the audience. However, the contestant will see which question was chosen as question 21 privately once back on stage with the host, and have to decide whether to play the question (and be forced to answer it) or walk away.

The questions vary, increasing in difficulty and degree of personal nature of the questions. Sometimes, a "surprise guest"—such as an ex-partner or a good friend—will come on the stage and ask a particularly difficult question. Friends, colleagues, and family of the contestant who are gathered near the player have access to a button which can be used to switch out a question once per game if they feel that the nature of the question is too personal, an option which is introduced to them after the third question. After the 20th question, the button can no longer be used.

Though no contestant on the shows aired by FOX has answered all 21 questions in concert with the polygraph results, according to Mike Darnell, president of alternative entertainment at Fox, "In the vast majority of contestants, 99%, you get, 'Hmm, I was a little worried when I answered that question.'" The series requires contestants to sign an agreement that they will accept the conclusions drawn by the polygraph examiner.

However, one contestant in the unaired second season episode (S02E09 and S02E10) did answer all 21 questions truthfully to win the top prize. The contestant was Melanie Williams, a member of the Fundamentalist Church of Jesus Christ of Latter-Day Saints, a secretive polygamy group in Utah. Most of the questions centered around the secrets of polygamy and what took place in the group in which Williams was a member. For $500,000, Williams' final question was whether she believed her father had sexual relations as an adult with a minor. She said she felt he did, and the lie detector determined her truthful for the grand prize.

== Reception ==
The first episode was the lead out after the highly rated American Idol, and managed to rate very well itself with 23 million viewers, the highest rating for a premiere to that point in 2008.

== Controversy ==
On the fifth episode, which aired on February 25, 2008, contestant Lauren Cleri truthfully admitted over the course of play that: she had been fired for stealing money from an employer; she believed that her ex-boyfriend (who was present, and asked this question) is the man she should be married to; and that, since her wedding day two years earlier, she had sexual relations with someone other than her husband. After truthfully admitting to these actions, with her mother staring furiously at her and her husband sitting with his head in his hands, she was eliminated for answering "yes" on the question of whether she believed she is a good person. The intro of this episode featured a disclaimer by host Mark L. Walberg, in which he claimed it was highly debated whether or not the episode should even be aired and he was against it being aired, calling it the most uncomfortable situation he has ever been in on television. Cleri, who could have stopped and left with $100,000 based on her already dramatic revelations, later said that she continued trying to win more money in order to achieve "fame and fortune".

== See also ==
- Nada más que la verdad
- Sacch Ka Saamna
- Trenutak istine
