= Chris Powell (personal trainer) =

American personal trainer and writer

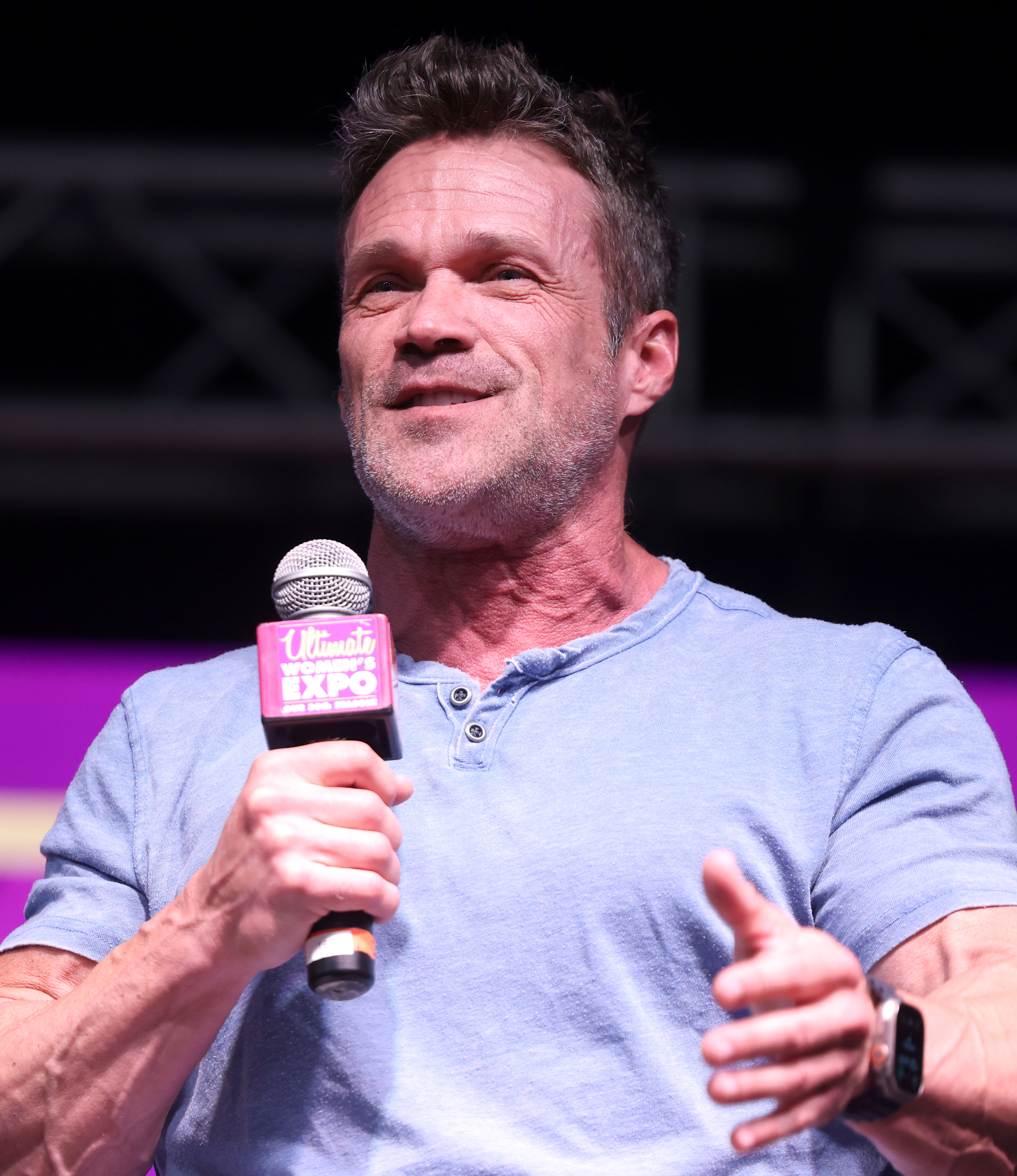
- Powell in 2026
- Born: March 2, 1978 (age 48); Phoenix, Arizona, U.S.
- Occupations: Personal trainer, reality show personality, author
- Height: 5 ft 8 in (1.73 m)
- Spouse: Heidi Powell (div. 2020)
- Children: 2
- Website: chrispowell.com

Christopher Powell (born March 2, 1978) is an American personal trainer, reality show personality, and author. Powell was the host of the television series Extreme Weight Loss, which aired from 2011 to 2015.

== Biography ==
Powell was the host and a personal trainer on Extreme Weight Loss, a U.S. reality television series. The show was formerly known as Extreme Makeover: Weight Loss Edition. Powell has also appeared in Extreme Weight Loss DVDs and is the author of two books: Choose to Lose: The 7-Day Carb Cycle Solution and Chris Powell's Choose More Lose More for Life. He has appeared on the Oprah Winfrey Show, 20/20, The View, and in a one-hour documentary that aired on TLC.

In 2008 Powell co-founded the web-based weight-loss program ReshapeTheNation.com. Powell also contributes to Good Morning Arizona, Good Morning America, and has a series of webisodes called "Meet the Powell Pack." Previously, in 2009, Powell participated in the TLC documentary 650-Pound Virgin as the trainer to David Elmore Smith, a 650 pound obese man seeking to achieve a healthy body weight.

== Personal life ==
Powell was married to author and fitness coach Heidi Powell for almost ten years. They announced their divorce on Instagram in May 2020. The two have two children together while Heidi has two children from a previous relationship.
