= Next (game show) =

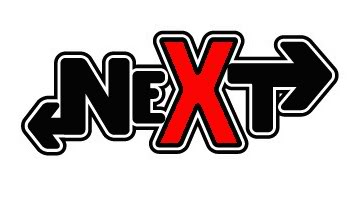
- Created by: Jacqui Pitman
- Country of origin: United States
- No. of seasons: 6
- No. of episodes: 288

Production
- Executive producers: Kallissa Miller; Jacqui Pitman; Howard Schultz
- Producers: D Renard Young; Kristi Fraijo; Dana Leiken; Peter Glowski; Jennifer Stander; Elizabeth Grizzle
- Running time: 30 minutes
- Production companies: Kallissa Productions; Reveille Producions Lighthearted Entertainment

Original release
- Network: MTV
- Release: May 4, 2005 – December 21, 2008

Next is a dating game show produced by Kallissa Miller with her production company Kallissa Productions, which ran on MTV from 2005 to 2008.

== Format ==
Next dealt with a contestant going on sequential blind dates with possibly up to five other single people, known as "the daters", who were secluded on a RV, referred to as the "Next Bus". The added twist was that the date could end at any time by the contestant shouting "next". Since the decision to move on and meet the next contestant is irreversible, this is an instance of the secretary problem.

== International versions ==
- The Spanish version, aired on Neox of Antena 3 in 2010.
- The French version aired in 2008 on Virgin 17 and MTV.
- The Lithuania show debuted in 2007 on LNK.
- The Chilean show debuted on September 22, 2008 and airs on MEGA.
- The Canadian series began around 2009 on Much Music.
- The Bulgarian series began around 2014 on TV7.
