= Serbian dinar =

Currency of Serbia

српски динар (Serbian) DIN / дин
din. 1,000 banknote
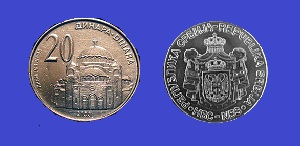
din. 20 coin

ISO 4217
- Code: RSD (numeric: 941)
- Subunit: 0.01

Units of account
- Plural: динари / dinari ("dinars"); The language(s) of this currency belong(s) to the Slavic languages. There is more than one way to construct plural forms.
- Subunit
- 1/100: пара / para (defunct)

Denominations
- Banknotes
- Freq. used: din. 10, din. 20, din. 50, din. 100, din. 200, din. 500, din. 1,000, din. 2,000
- Rarely used: din. 5,000
- Coins
- Freq. used: din. 1, din. 2, din. 5
- Rarely used: din. 10, din. 20

Demographics
- Replaced: Yugoslav dinar
- User(s): Serbia

Issuance
- Central bank: National Bank of Serbia
- Website: nbs.rs
- Printer: Institute for Manufacturing Banknotes and Coins - Topčider, Belgrade
- Website: zin.rs
- Mint: Institute for Manufacturing Banknotes and Coins - Topčider, Belgrade
- Website: zin.rs

Valuation
- Inflation: 4.4% (October 2026)
- Source: Statistical Office of Serbia
- Method: CPI

The dinar (Serbian Cyrillic: динар, pronounced [dînaːr]; paucal: dinara, динара; abbreviation: DIN (Latin) and дин (Cyrillic); code: RSD) is the currency of Serbia. The dinar was first used in Serbia in medieval times, its earliest use dating back to 1214. The dinar was reintroduced as the official Serbian currency by Prince Mihailo in 1868. It was used until the 1920s when it was replaced by the Yugoslav dinar, then shortly during World War II in Yugoslavia. It was re-introduced in Serbia and Montenegro in 2003, and has been used in Serbia since. One dinar was formerly subdivided into 100 para (пара). As of 13 April 2026, 1 US dollar is worth 100.09 Serbian dinars.

== History ==
=== Medieval Serbian dinar ===
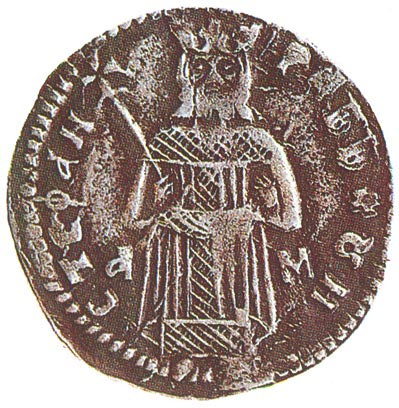
Dinar of King Stefan Dragutin, 13th century

The first mention of a "Serbian dinar" dates back to the reign of Stefan the First-Crowned in 1214. Until the fall of Despot Stjepan Tomašević in 1459, most of the Serbian rulers minted silver dinar coins. The first Serbian dinars, like many other south-European coins, replicated Venetian grosso, including characters in Latin (the word 'Dux' replaced with the word 'Rex'). It was one of the main export articles of medieval Serbia for many years, considering the relative abundance of silver coming from Serbian mines. Venetians were wary of this, and Dante Alighieri went so far as to put the Serbian king of his time, Stephen Uroš II Milutin of Serbia, in Hell as a forger (along with his Portuguese and Norwegian counterparts):

E quel di Portogallo e di Norvegia lì si conosceranno, e quel di Rascia che male ha visto il conio di Vinegia.

=== First modern Serbian dinar (1868–1920) ===
Following the Ottoman conquest, different foreign currencies were used up to the mid-19th century. The Ottomans operated coin mints in Novo Brdo, Kučajna and Belgrade. The subdivision of the dinar, the para, is named after the Turkish silver coins of the same name (from the Persian پاره pāra, 'money, coin'). After the Principality of Serbia was formally established (1817), there were many different foreign coins in circulation. Eventually, Prince Miloš Obrenović decided to introduce some order by establishing exchange rates based on the groat (Serbian groš, French and English piastre, Turkish kuruş, قروش) as money of account. In 1819 Prince Miloš Obrenović published a table rating 43 different foreign coins: 10 gold, 28 silver, and 5 copper.

After the last Ottoman garrisons were withdrawn in 1867, Serbia was faced with multiple currencies in circulation. Thus, the prince Mihailo Obrenović ordered a national currency be minted. The first bronze coins were introduced in 1868, followed by silver in 1875 and gold in 1879. The first banknotes were issued in 1876. Between 1873 and 1894, the dinar was pegged at par to the French franc. The Kingdom of Serbia also joined the Latin Monetary Union and adhered to a bimetallic standard up until 1914. Attempts to put the Serbian dinar solely onto the gold standard were hampered by widening budget deficits, significant government foreign debt and poor gold reserves.

In 1920, the Serbian dinar was replaced at par by the Yugoslav dinar, with the Yugoslav krone also circulating together.

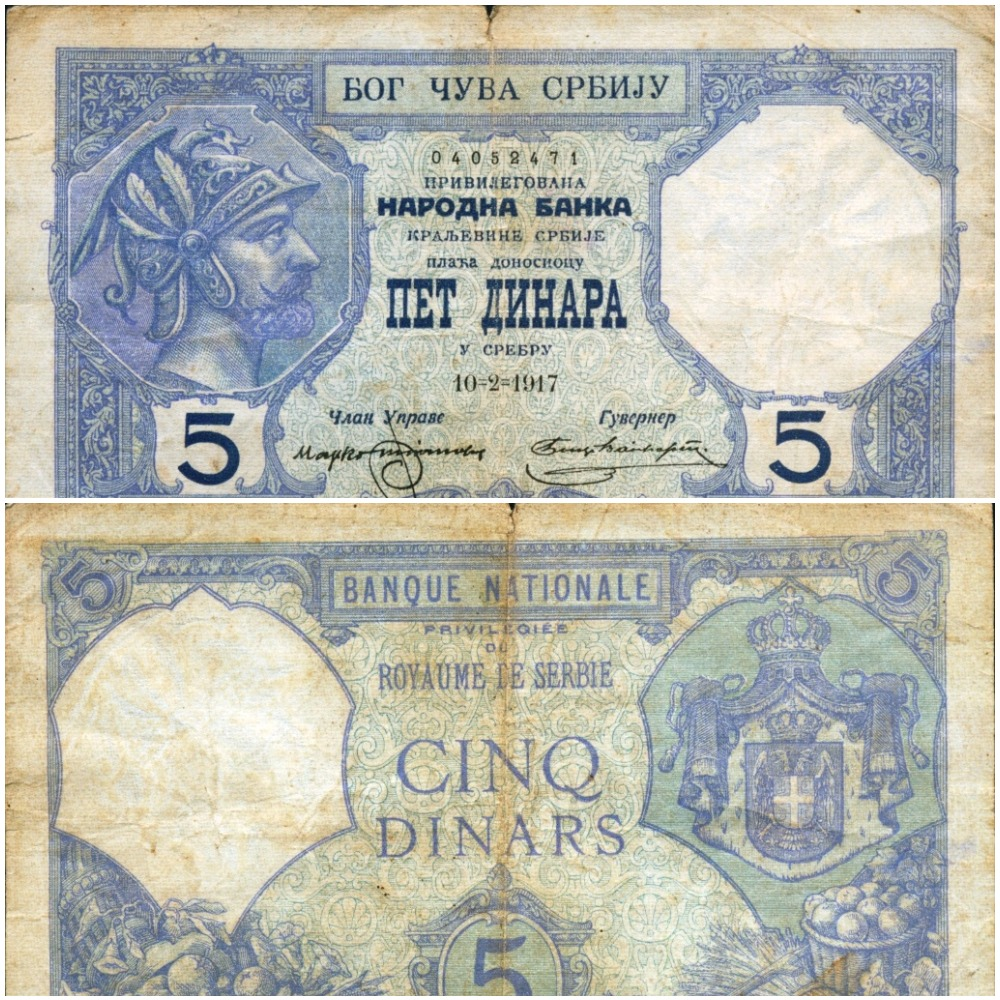
Obverse and reverse of 5 dinar banknote issued in 1917, featuring Miloš Obilić

==== Coins ====
In 1868, bronze coins were introduced in denominations of 1, 5, and 10 paras. The obverses featured the portrait of Prince Mihailo Obrenović III. Silver coins were introduced in 1875, in denominations of 50 paras, 1 and 2 dinars, followed by 5 dinars in 1879. The first gold coins were also issued in 1879, for 20 dinars, with 10 dinars introduced in 1882. The gold coins issued for the coronation of Milan I coronation in 1882 were popularly called milandor (French: Milan d'Or). In 1883, cupro-nickel 5, 10, and 20 para coins were introduced, followed by bronze 2 para coins in 1904.

==== Banknotes ====
In 1876, state notes were introduced in denominations of 1, 5, 10, 50, and 100 dinars. The Chartered National Bank followed these notes from 1884, with notes for 10 dinars backed by silver and gold notes for 50 and 100 dinars. Gold notes for 20 dinars and silver notes for 100 dinars were introduced in 1905. However, gold-backed notes were not received well by the public. Lack of public faith in the Serbian dinar, bartering and immediate exchange for gold coins meant that the notes fell out of circulation. Silver-backed notes were however well received and made up 95% of total note circulation. During the Balkan Wars and on the eve of World War I, bank note conversions to gold and silver were temporarily suspended. During World War I, silver notes for 50 and 5 dinars were introduced in 1914 and 1916, respectively. In 1915, stamps were authorized for circulation as currency in denominations of 5, 10, 15, 20, 25, 30, and 50 paras.

=== Second modern Serbian dinar (1941–1944) ===
In 1941, the Yugoslav dinar was replaced, at par, by a second Serbian dinar for use in the German occupied Serbia. The dinar was pegged to the German reichsmark at a rate of 250 dinars = 1 reichsmark. This dinar circulated until 1944, when the Yugoslav dinar was reintroduced by the Yugoslav Partisans, replacing the Serbian dinar rate of 1 Yugoslav dinar = 20 Serbian dinars.

==== Coins ====
In 1942, zinc coins were introduced in denominations of 50 paras, 1 and 2 dinars, with 10 dinar coins following in 1943.

==== Banknotes ====
In May 1941, the Serbian National Bank introduced notes for 10, 20, 50, 100, 500, and 1,000 dinars. The 100 and 1,000 dinar notes were overprints, whilst the 10 dinar design was taken from an earlier Yugoslav note. Other notes were introduced in 1942 and 1943 without any new denominations being introduced.

=== Third modern Serbian dinar (2003–present) ===
The Serbian dinar replaced the Yugoslav dinar in 2003 when the Federal Republic of Yugoslavia was transformed into the State Union of Serbia and Montenegro. Both Montenegro and the disputed territory of Kosovo had already adopted the Deutsche Mark and later the euro when the mark was replaced by it in 2002. The Serbs in North Kosovo and the enclaves within it continued to use the dinar until 2024 when the Kosovan government banned the use of the dinar for payment, making the euro the sole legal tender nationwide.

Between 2003 and 2006, the Serbian dinar used the ISO 4217 code CSD, with CS being the ISO 3166-1 country code for Serbia and Montenegro. When the State Union was dissolved in 2006, the dinar's ISO 4217 code was changed to the current RSD.

== Coins ==
Coins currently in circulation are din. 1, din. 2, din. 5, din. 10, and din. 20 coins. All coins feature identical inscriptions in Serbian, using the Cyrillic and Latin scripts. The din. 10 and din. 20 coins are uncommon in circulation, as banknotes of the same value are used instead.

Coins
Image	Value	Technical parameters			Description			Date of			
Image	Value	Diameter	Mass	Composition	Edge	Obverse	Reverse	Minting	Issue	Withdrawal	Lapse
1 RSD Coin 2003 Obverse 1 RSD Coin 2003 Reverse	din. 1	20 mm	4.34g	70% Cu, 12% Ni, 18% Zn	reeded	Denomination, the relief of the National Bank of Serbia building, year of minting	Logo of the National Bank of Serbia	2003, 2004	2 July 2003	Current	
1 RSD Coin 2005 Obverse 1 RSD Coin 2005 Reverse	din. 1	20 mm	4.26g	75% Cu, 0,5% Ni, 24,5% Zn	reeded	Denomination, the relief of the National Bank of Serbia building, year of minting	Greater coat of arms of Serbia	2005-2009	2 July 2005	Current	
1 RSD Coin 2019 Obverse 1 RSD Coin 2005 Reverse	din. 1^{a}	20 mm	4.2g	Multilayer; low-carbon steel core coated with a layer of copper on both sides/electroplated with a layer of copper and a layer of brass	reeded	Denomination, the relief of the National Bank of Serbia building, year of minting	Greater coat of arms of Serbia	2009-present	20 March 2009	Current	
2 RSD Coin 2003 Obverse 2 RSD Coin 2003 Reverse	din. 2	22 mm	5.24g	70% Cu, 12% Ni, 18% Zn	reeded	Denomination, the relief of the Gračanica monastery, year of minting	Logo of the National Bank of Serbia	2003	2 July 2003	Current	
2 RSD Coin 2006 Obverse 2 RSD Coin 2006 Reverse	din. 2	22 mm	5.15g	75% Cu, 0,5% Ni, 24,5% Zn	reeded	Denomination, the relief of the Gračanica monastery, year of minting	Greater coat of arms of Serbia	2006-2010	27 December 2006	Current	
2 RSD Coin 2019 Obverse 2 RSD Coin 2019 Reverse	din. 2^{a}	22 mm	5.05g	Multilayer; low-carbon steel core coated with a layer of copper on both sides/electroplated with a layer of copper and a layer of brass	reeded	Denomination, the relief of the Gračanica monastery, year of minting	Greater coat of arms of Serbia	2009-present	20 March 2009	Current	
5 RSD Coin 2003 Obverse	din. 5	24 mm	6.23g	70% Cu, 12% Ni, 18% Zn	reeded	Denomination, the relief of the Krušedol monastery, year of minting	Logo of the National Bank of Serbia	2003	2 July 2003	Current	
5 RSD Coin 2005 Obverse 5 RSD Coin 2005 Reverse	din. 5	24 mm	6.13g	75% Cu, 0,5% Ni, 24,5% Zn	reeded	Denomination, the relief of the Krušedol monastery, year of minting	Greater coat of arms of Serbia	2005-2012	2 July 2005	Current	
5 RSD Coin 2019 Obverse 5 RSD Coin 2019 Reverse	din. 5^{a}	24 mm	5.78g	Multilayer; low-carbon steel core coated with a layer of copper on both sides/electroplated with a layer of copper and a layer of brass	reeded	Denomination, the relief of the Krušedol monastery, year of minting	Greater coat of arms of Serbia	2013-present	5 July 2013	Current	
10 RSD Coin 2003 Obverse 10 RSD Coin 2003 Reverse	din. 10	26 mm	7.77 g	70% Cu, 12% Ni, 18% Zn	reeded	Denomination, the relief of the Studenica monastery, year of minting	Logo of the National Bank of Serbia	2003	2 July 2003	current	
10 RSD Coin 2003 Obverse 10 RSD Coin 2005 Reverse	din. 10	26 mm	7.77 g	70% Cu, 12% Ni, 18% Zn	reeded	Denomination, the relief of the Studenica monastery, year of minting	Greater coat of arms of Serbia	2005-present	2 July 2005	current	
10 RSD Coin 2009 Obverse 10 RSD Coin 2009 Reverse	din. 10	26 mm	7.77 g	70% Cu, 12% Ni, 18% Zn	reeded	Denomination, the 2009 Summer Universiade logo, year of minting	Greater coat of arms of Serbia	2009	26 June 2009	current	
20 RSD Coin 2003 Obverse 20 RSD Coin 2003 Reverse	din. 20	28 mm	9.00 g	70% Cu, 12% Ni, 18% Zn	reeded	Denomination, Church of Saint Sava, year of minting	Logo of the National Bank of Serbia	2003	2 July 2003	current	
20 RSD Coin 2006 Obverse 20 RSD Coin 2006 Reverse	din. 20	28 mm	9.00 g	70% Cu, 12% Ni, 18% Zn	reeded	Denomination, a relief portrait of Nikola Tesla, year of minting	Greater coat of arms of Serbia	2006	30 July 2006	current	
20 RSD Coin 2007 Obverse 20 RSD Coin 2007 Reverse	din. 20	28 mm	9.00 g	70% Cu, 12% Ni, 18% Zn	reeded	Denomination, a relief portrait of Dositej Obradović, year of minting	Greater coat of arms of Serbia	2007	10 December 2007	current	
20 RSD Coin 2009 Obverse 20 RSD Coin 2009 Reverse	din. 20	28 mm	9.00 g	70% Cu, 12% Ni, 18% Zn	reeded	Denomination, a relief portrait of Milutin Milanković, year of minting	Greater coat of arms of Serbia	2009	26 June 2009	current	
20 RSD Coin 2010 Obverse 20 RSD Coin 2010 Reverse	din. 20	28 mm	9.00 g	70% Cu, 12% Ni, 18% Zn	reeded	Denomination, a relief portrait of Đorđe Vajfert, year of minting	Greater coat of arms of Serbia	2010	16 June 2010	current	
20 RSD Coin 2011 Obverse 20 RSD Coin 2011 Reverse	din. 20	28 mm	9.00 g	70% Cu, 12% Ni, 18% Zn	reeded	Denomination, a relief portrait of Ivo Andrić, year of minting	Greater coat of arms of Serbia	2011	20 May 2011	current	
20 RSD Coin 2012 Obverse 20 RSD Coin 2012 Reverse	din. 20	28 mm	9.00 g	70% Cu, 12% Ni, 18% Zn	reeded	Denomination, a relief portrait of Mihajlo Pupin, year of minting	Greater coat of arms of Serbia	2012	8 June 2012	current	
These images are to scale at 2.5 pixels per millimetre. For table standards, see the coin specification table.^{a} In 2010, the Greater coat of arms of Serbia was slightly modified. In 2013, the metal content was slightly altered.

== Banknotes ==
In 2003, banknotes of the (re-established) National Bank of Serbia were introduced in denominations of din. 100, din. 1,000, and din. 5,000. din. 500 followed these in 2004, din. 50 in 2005, din. 10, din. 20 and din. 200 in 2006, din. 2,000 in 2011.

Denomination	Obverse Image	Reverse Image	Main Colour	Obverse	Reverse	Remark
din. 10; 131 × 62 mm	10 dinars obverse		Ochre-yellow	Vuk Karadžić (1787 – 1864), philologist and linguist	Seated figure of Vuk Karadžić, first Prague Slavic Congress, vignette of the letters introduced by Vuk Karadžić.	Replaced with a slightly lighter 2006 issue. A revised issue entered circulation in 2011.
din. 20; 135 × 64 mm	20 dinars obverse	20 dinars reverse	Green	Petar II Petrović-Njegoš (1813 – 1851), metropolitan bishop and poet	Figure of Petar II Petrović-Njegoš, a motif of Mount Lovćen.	Replaced with a slightly lighter 2006 issue. A revised issue entered circulation in 2011.
din. 50; 139 × 66 mm	50 dinars obverse	50 dinars reverse	Violet	Stevan Stojanović Mokranjac (1856 – 1914), composer	Figure of Stevan Stojanović Mokranjac, a motif of Miroslav Gospels illumination scores.	Redesigned in 2005. A revised issue entered circulation in 2011.
din. 100; 143 × 68 mm	100 dinars	100 dinars reverse	Blue	Nikola Tesla (1856 – 1943), inventor	Figure of Nikola Tesla, a detail from the Tesla electro-magnetic induction engine.	Redesigned in 2003, 2004, and 2006. A revised issue entered circulation in 2012.
din. 200; 147 × 70 mm	200 dinars obverse	200 dinars reverse	Brown	Nadežda Petrović (1873 – 1915), painter	Figure of Nadežda Petrović, silhouette of the Gračanica Monastery.	Redesigned in 2005. A revised issue entered circulation in 2011.
din. 500; 147 × 70 mm	500 dinars obverse	500 dinars reverse	Cyan	Jovan Cvijić (1865 – 1927), geographer	Seated figure of Jovan Cvijić, stylized ethnic motifs.	Redesigned in 2007. A revised issue entered circulation in 2011.
din. 1,000; 151 × 72 mm	1000 dinars obverse	1000 dinars reverse	Red	Đorđe Vajfert (1850 – 1937), industrialist	Seated figure of Đorđe Vajfert, hologram image of St. George slaying a dragon, details of the main hall of the National Bank of Serbia building.	Redesigned in 2003 and 2006. A revised issue entered circulation in 2011.
din. 2,000; 155 × 74 mm	2000 dinars obverse	2000 dinars reverse	Olive Green	Milutin Milanković (1879 – 1958), mathematician and astronomer	Figure of Milutin Milanković, stylised Sun disk drawing fragment and an illustration of Milanković's work.	Entered circulation in 2011.
din. 5,000; 159 × 76 mm	5000 dinars obverse	5000 dinars reverse	Purple	Slobodan Jovanović (1869 – 1958), jurist, historian and politician	Figure of Slobodan Jovanović, silhouette of the hemicycle, portico and the dome of the House of the National Assembly.	Redesigned in 2010. A revised issue entered circulation in 2016.

== Exchange rate ==
Current RSD exchange rates
From Google Finance:	AUD CAD CHF CNY EUR GBP HKD JPY USD TRY
From Yahoo! Finance:	AUD CAD CHF CNY EUR GBP HKD JPY USD TRY
From XE.com:	AUD CAD CHF CNY EUR GBP HKD JPY USD TRY
From OANDA:	AUD CAD CHF CNY EUR GBP HKD JPY USD TRY

== See also ==
- Economy of Serbia
- Macedonian denar
- Yugoslav dinar
- Yugoslav krone
