= Howard Schultz (producer) =

American television producer (1953–2014)

Howard Schultz (October 14, 1953 – December 29, 2014) was an American television producer best known for his long-running reality series Extreme Makeover. He also produced Next, The Moment of Truth and 72 Hours. His last production was the VH1 reality series Dating Naked. In 1992, he founded Lighthearted Entertainment. Schultz died unexpectedly in December 2014 while vacationing in Hawaii at the age of 61.
