= Postage stamps and postal history of Slovenia =

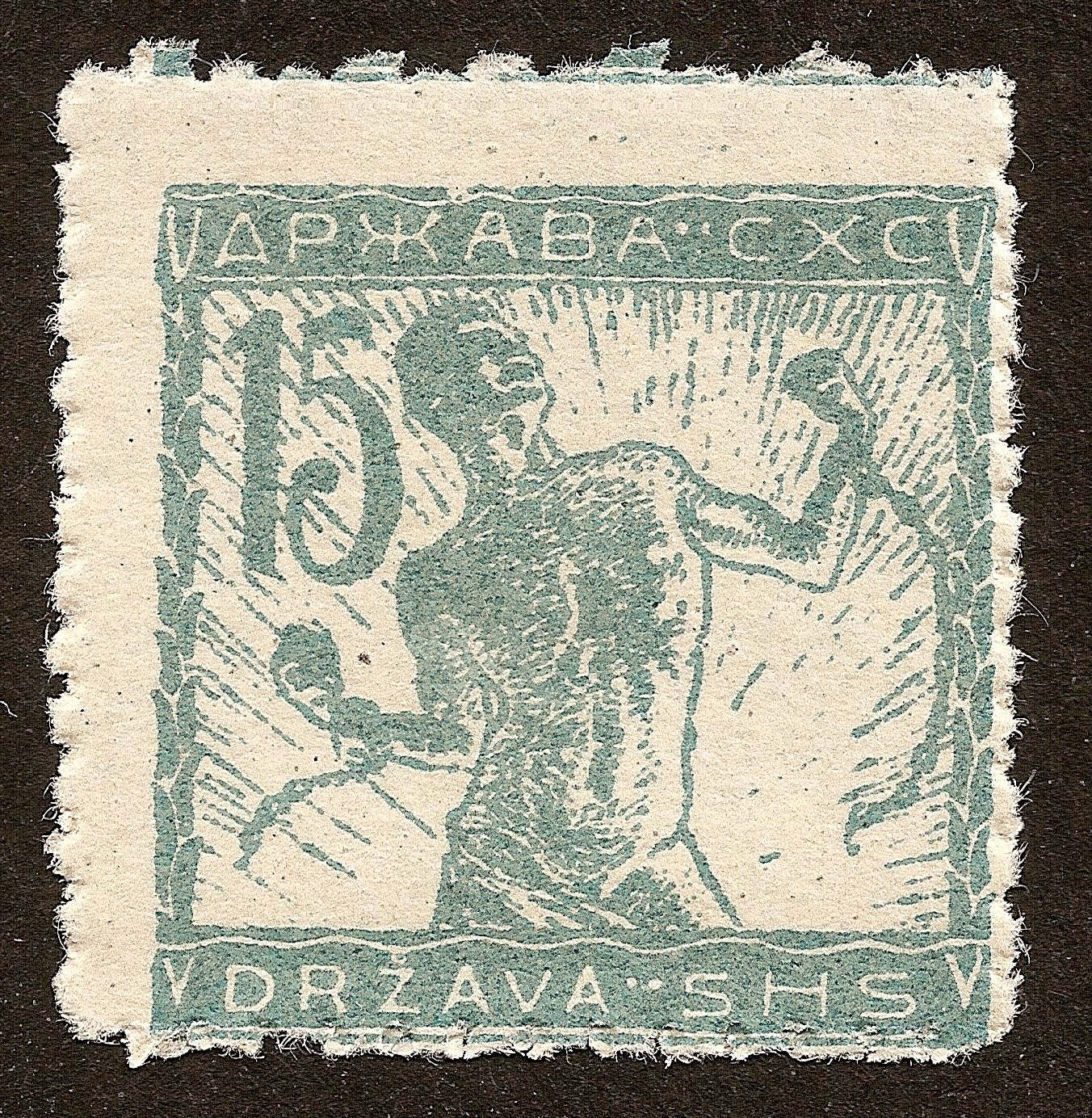
Verigar issue "chainbreaker" stamp of the State of Slovenes, Croats and Serbs, 1919

This is a survey of the postage stamps and postal history of Slovenia.

Slovenia is a country in Central Europe touching the Alps and bordering the Mediterranean. Slovenia borders Italy on the west, the Adriatic Sea on the southwest, Croatia on the south and east, Hungary on the northeast, and Austria on the north. The capital and largest city of Slovenia is Ljubljana. Slovenia covers an area of 20,271 square kilometres and has a population of over 2 million. The majority of the population speaks Slovene which is also the country's official language. Other local official languages are Hungarian and Italian.

== Kingdom in 1918 ==
Slovenia was part of the Austro-Hungarian Empire until 1918 when it became part of the Kingdom of Serbs, Croats and Slovenes. Stamps were issued specifically for Slovenia, including the well known "chainbreakers" series, until the first stamps for use throughout the kingdom were issued in January 1921. The name of the kingdom was changed to the Kingdom of Yugoslavia in 1929.

== World War II ==
On 8 July 1941 the Germans annexed parts of Slovenia, as Lower Styria, extending south to the River Sava and German stamps were used.

=== Ljubljana Province ===
Italy later annexed the rest of Slovenia as the Province of Ljubljana. In September 1943 Italy ended hostilities with the allies and the Germans occupied Ljubljana. Stamps were issued by both countries, most of which were overprints on existing stamps.

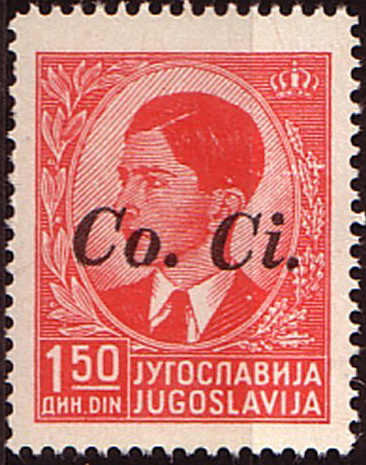
A Yugoslav stamp overprinted Co. Ci. (abbreviation for the Civil Commissariat of the Occupied Slovenian Territories) for Ljubljana under Italian occupation in 1941

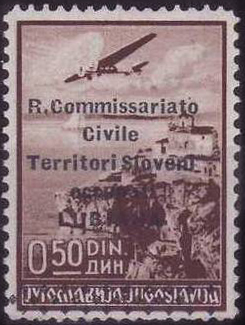
A Yugoslav stamp overprinted R. Commissariato Civile Territori Sloveni occupati Lubiana (Royal Civil Commissariat of the Occupied Slovenian Territories of Ljubljana) for Ljubljana under Italian occupation in 1941

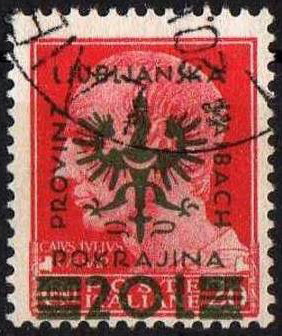
An Italian stamp overprinted for the Province of Ljubljana under German occupation in 1944

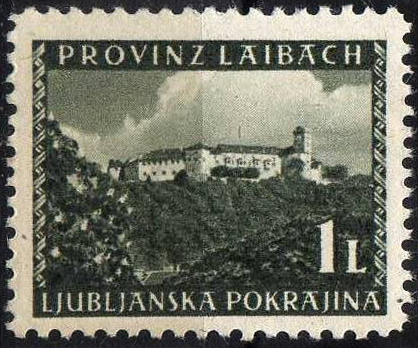
A 1945 stamp for the Province of Ljubljana under German occupation

== Post war ==
In 1945 the most territory of Slovenia became part of the federal republic of Yugoslavia and used its stamps until 1991–92.

=== Slovene Littoral and Slovenian Istria during Free Territory of Trieste ===
The Free Territory of Trieste was an independent Republic existing from 1947-09-15 until 1954-10-05.
This territorial segmentation was established officially with the 1947-09-15 according to an additional protocol to the Treaty of Peace with Italy from 1947-02-10 ...in order to accommodate an ethnically and culturally mixed population in a neutral independent country.... Thereupon, the Free Territory of Trieste was official divided into two parts ("Zone A" and "Zone B"). In 1954 was each of these zones given to its neighbours Italy ("Zone A") and Yugoslavia ("Zone B"). This was formalized confirmed by the "Treaty of Osimo" of 1975 (ratified in 1977).

Stamps of the "Free Territory of Trieste" (Italian: "Territorio libero di Trieste") were initially the stamps of Italy with overprint "A.M.G – F.T.T." (= "Allied Military Government – Free Territory Trieste" = Zone A) or stamps of Italia, Yugoslavia, Croatia, and Slovenia with overprints "V.U.J.A." (= "Vojna uprava jugoslavenske Armije"), "Demokratska federativna Jugoslavija", "Istra" or similar (= for Zone B, Dalmatia, Fiume, Istria, Lubiana, Montenegro, and Trieste)).

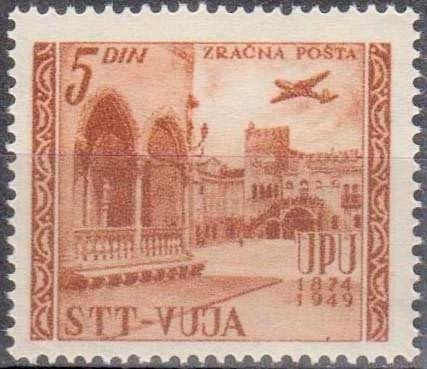
A postage stamp for Zone B of the Free Territory of Trieste, 1952 showing Koper-Capodistria

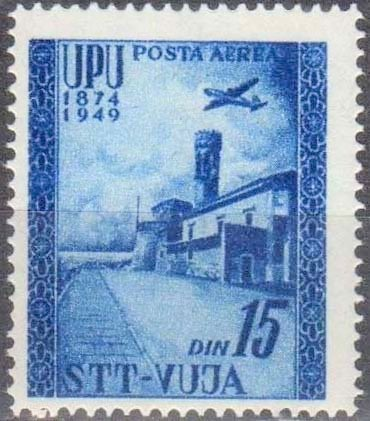
A postage stamp for Zone B of the Free Territory of Trieste, 1952 showing Piran-Pirano

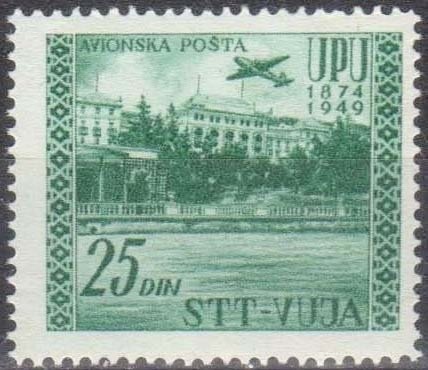
A postage stamp for Zone B of the Free Territory of Trieste, 1952 showing Portorož-Portorose

== Independent Slovenia ==
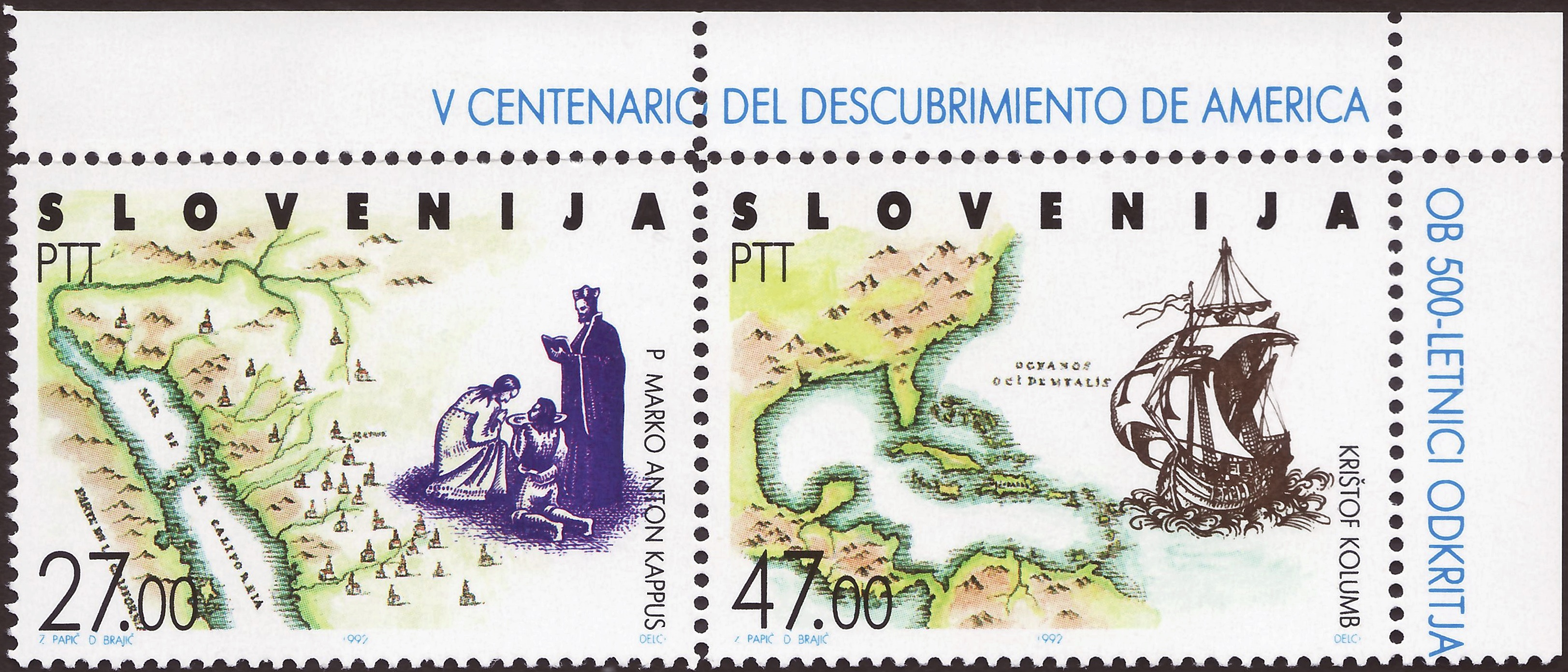
Stamps of Slovenia, 1992

The first stamp of independent Slovenia was issued on 26 June 1991. Yugoslav stamps were valid for postage in Slovenia until 25 April 1992.

== See also ==
- Postage stamps and postal history of Yugoslavia
