= Postage stamps and postal history of Croatia =

This is a survey of the postage stamps and postal history of Croatia.

== Austria-Hungary ==
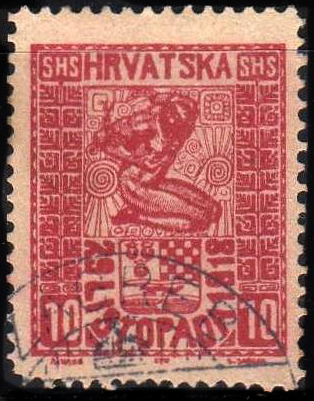
A 1918 stamp for Croatia depicting "Liberated Croatia"

Prior to 1918, Croatia, including Slavonia, was part of the Austro-Hungarian Empire, and beginning in 1850 with the introduction of postage stamps, the stamps of the empire were used. In 1871, after the Croatian–Hungarian Settlement, the new stamps of the Kingdom of Hungary were used, except in Dalmatia which continued to use Austrian stamps.

== Kingdom in 1918 ==
In 1918, as part of the State of Slovenes, Croats and Serbs (SHS), Croatia overprinted the existing stocks of Hungarian stamps, with "Hrvatska SHS". In 1919 they printed their own stamps with "Hrvatska" (Croatia) as the country name, some of which also included an "SHS".

These were used until 1921, when the Kingdom of Serbs, Croats and Slovenes, later the Kingdom of Yugoslavia, began issuing stamps for use throughout the kingdom.

== World War II ==
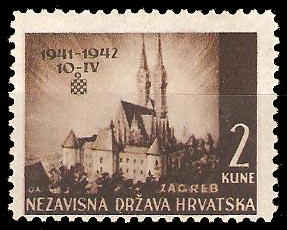
A 1942 2 kune stamp of the Independent State of Croatia depicting Zagreb Cathedral

With the establishment of the Independent State of Croatia (NDH) in 1941, the new government first overprinted existing stocks of Yugoslav stamps with "Nezavisna Drzava Hrvatska", and then issued its own stamps that same year.

=== 'Landscape' definitives ===
The 'Landscape' series is a set of 23 different value stamps which show views of Croatia. They were first released between November 1941 and September 1942 and were the country's definitives until their replacement in 1944. The local rate for mail was 2k between 16 November 1941 and 31 December 1942. Registered mail came with an extra 9k charge.

Tête-bêche issues exist of values which were printed in November and December 1941; they are not found in the 0.75k, 3k, 5k green-blue, 12k and 100k values which were all issued in 1942. In 1942, activity by Partisans affected the railway network and created shortages of stamps especially in rural areas. This led to stamps being bisected and a particular shortage of 0.25k stamps in June 1942 meant that overprints were created from supplies of 2k stamps.

Aging machinery caused perforation errors and wartime paper shortages resulted in stamps being printed on six different types of paper including pelure, which was so thin that the images on the stamps can be seen through the paper.

== Post war ==
With the fall of the NDH government in 1945, stamps of the Independent State of Croatia were overprinted with a star and "Jugoslavia" or a star and "Demokratska Federativna", but were soon replaced by the stamps of the federal republic of Yugoslavia, beginning with the Marshal Tito stamps of 1945.

== Independence ==
With the resumption of independence in 1991, the Republic of Croatia again reinstated the Croatian Post, with the first new postage stamp being an airmail issued 9 September 1991, and with the first new regular postage stamp being issued on 21 November 1991. However, on 1 April 1991 Croatia had issued a postal tax stamp, required on all mail during the month of April 1991, with the tax payable to the State's Worker’s Fund. The stamp was affixed alongside the regular Yugoslav postage stamps which paid the transmittal fees.

Croatia joined the Universal Postal Union on 20 July 1992, and was an initial participating country in the WADP Numbering System.

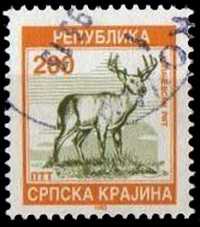
A 1993 stamp of the self-proclaimed Serbian Krajina

=== Serbian Krajina ===
Serbian Krajina was a self-proclaimed Serb state within Croatia during the Croatian War of Independence which issued its own stamps. Serbian Krajina was disbanded in 1995 and the eastern part placed under UNTAES administration until reintegration into Croatia in 1998.

== Fiume (Rijeka) ==
In 1918 with the breakup of the Austro-Hungarian Empire, Rijeka was disputed between Italy and the Kingdom of the Serbs, Croats and Slovenes. For a very short time, overprinted Hungarian stamps were used, but in 1919 Italian irredentists established the Italian Regency of Carnaro which issued its own stamps. These were replaced by the stamps of the Free State of Fiume. On 21 March 1924, following the Treaty of Rome between Italy and Yugoslavia, the two countries agreed to partition the territory.

== Dalmatia ==
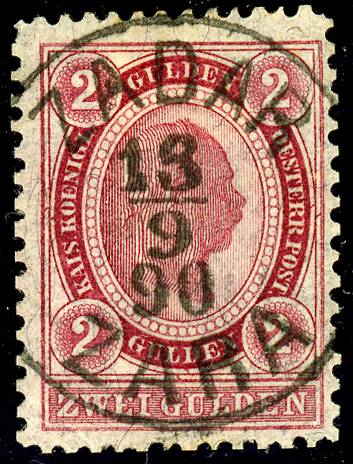
Austrian stamp used in Zadar

Before World War I, the stamps of Austria were used in Dalmatia. Some parts of Dalmatia were occupied by Italy during World War I, and used Italian stamps. In 1919 Italy printed special stamps for these Dalmatian territories. In 1920, this occupation was confirmed by the Treaty of Rapallo, including the annexation of Zadar to Italy. Following which Italian stamps were used. After the 1943 surrender of Italy to the Allies in World War II these former Italian parts of Dalmatia were occupied by German troops and Italian stamps were overprinted by German authorities for use. After troops under Marshal Tito took these areas, the stamps of Yugoslavia were used.

== See also ==
- Postage stamps and postal history of Yugoslavia
- Chimson Collection
- List of people on stamps of Croatia
