= Postage stamps and postal history of North Macedonia =

1997 stamps of the Republic of Macedonia

This is a survey of the postage stamps and postal history of North Macedonia.

The Republic of North Macedonia, until February 2019 the Republic of Macedonia, is a country located in the central Balkan Peninsula in Southeastern Europe. It is one of the successor states to Yugoslavia, from which it declared independence in 1991.

== Kingdoms of Serbia and Yugoslavia ==
As a result of the Balkan Wars of 1912 and 1913 and the fall of the Ottoman Empire, the territory of present-day North Macedonia became part of the Kingdom of Serbia.

In 1915, during World War I, the territory North Macedonia was occupied by Bulgaria. Post offices were organized by the Bulgarian authorities in the occupied territory. After the end of the First World War, the area returned to Serbian control as part of the newly formed Kingdom of Serbs, Croats and Slovenes, later the Kingdom of Yugoslavia. The first stamps for the kingdom were issued in January 1921.

== World War II ==
During World War II, North Macedonia was occupied by the Axis powers and divided between Bulgaria and Italian-occupied Albania. At the end of the Second World War, North Macedonia became part of the federal republic of Yugoslavia as the People’s Republic of Macedonia and used its stamps.

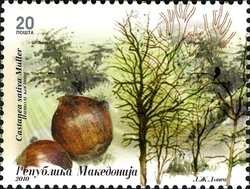
2010 stamps of the Republic of Macedonia

== Independence ==
The first stamps of the Republic of Macedonia were issued in 1992. Since 2019, stamps are inscribed "Republic of North Macedonia".

== See also ==
- Postage stamps and postal history of Yugoslavia
