= Chismon Collection =

Collection of Croatian philatelic material

The Chismon Collection is a collection of Croatian philatelic material formed by Harvey John Chismon and given to the British Library by his son Joseph Chismon in 2009. It forms part of the British Library Philatelic Collections.

== See also ==
- Postage stamps and postal history of Croatia
