= Postage stamps and postal history of Yugoslavia =

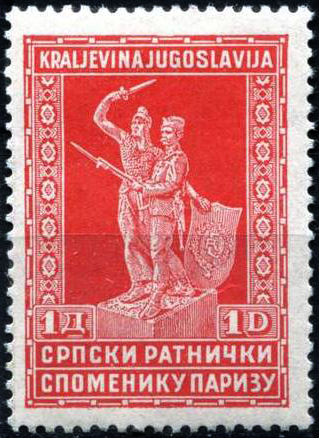
A 1931 stamp of Yugoslavia

The story of the postage stamps and postal history of Yugoslavia officially begins with the formation of the Kingdom of Serbs, Croats and Slovenes on 1 December 1918.

== Formation ==
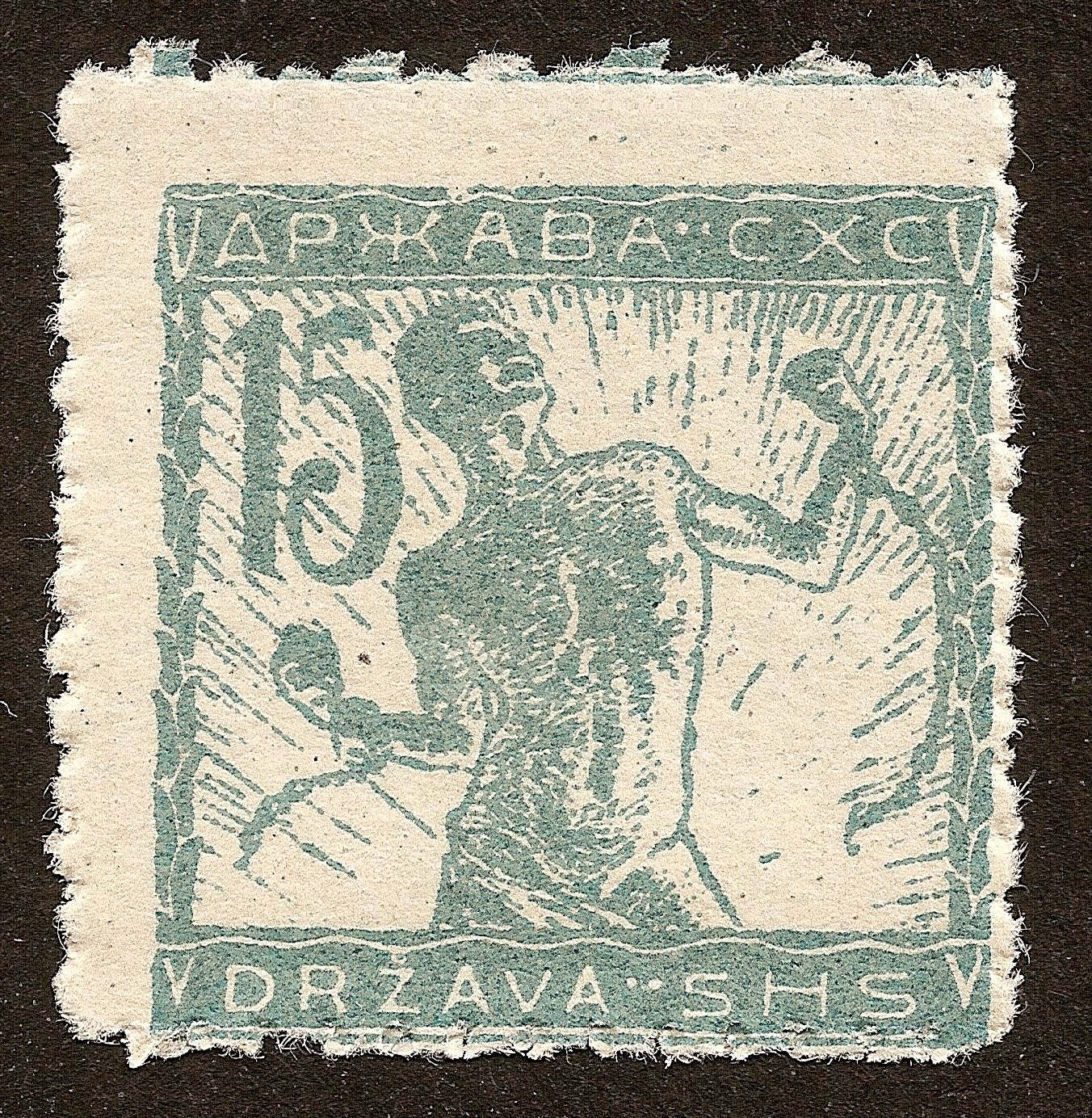
Verigar issue of the State of Slovenes, Croats and Serbs, 1919 issued in Slovenia

Prior to the formation of the Kingdom, each of the constituent territories had their own postal systems and history. Bosnia and Herzegovina and Croatia-Slavonia actually issued stamps for the new regime in November, before it was formally created. In the former case the Austrian-issued pictorial stamps of 1910 were overprinted, some in Latin characters reading "DRZAVA S.H.S. / 1918 1918 / Bosna j Hercegovina" and others in their Cyrillic equivalent. In Croatia-Slavonia, stamps of Hungary overprinted with "HRVATSKA / SHS" went on sale 18 November. In Slovenia, design work began at this time, with the first stamps of the Verigar issue going on sale 3 January 1919.

Croatia-Slavonia issued their own designs of stamps in 1919 as well, using various allegorical designs. Slovenia issued additional allegorical designs in 1919, along with high values depicting King Peter I.

== First stamps ==
The first stamps intended for use throughout the kingdom were issued 16 January 1921. The lower values depicted Crown Prince Alexander, and the higher values (1 dinar and up), King Peter. In January 1923, the higher values were replaced by the image of now-King Alexander. Variations on the design appeared in issues of 1924 (different portrait) and 1926 (facing right instead of left, typographed instead of engraved).

== Yugoslavia ==
The name of the state was changed to "Kingdom of Yugoslavia" on 3 October 1929. In 1931, a new series was the first to be inscribed "JUGOSLAVIA". The old series of 1926 was also overprinted with the new name, in 1933. Just a week after Alexander's assassination in 1934, the 1931 issues were re-issued with black borders, and in 1935, the first anniversary of his death was marked by an issue of five stamps. In the meantime, new definitives depicted the young King Peter II.

In 1936, Serbian-American inventor Nikola Tesla, honored on his 80th birthday, became the first non-royal on a Yugoslavian stamp.

A new definitive series of 1939 showed an older Peter II; it would be the last series issued by the kingdom.

== World War II ==
During the occupations of World War II, a variety of issues were in use. Slovenia was under Italian and then German occupation; the Italians overprinted Yugoslavian stamps, while the Germans overprinted Italian stamps and then in 1945 issued a series of 16 stamps depicting local scenery and inscribed "PROVINZ LAIBACH" and "LJUBLJANSKA POKRAJINA". Serbia was under German occupation, which overprinted Yugoslav stamps with "SERBIEN", and later issued its own stamps. Croatia became a puppet state issuing its own stamps.

== Federal Yugoslavia ==
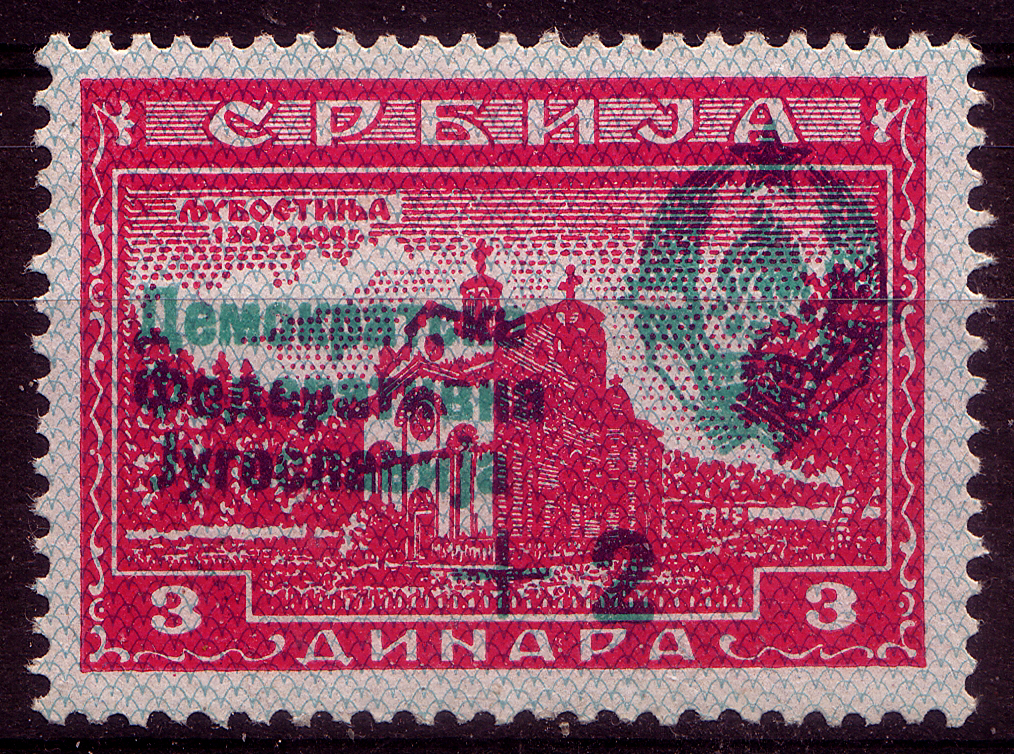
German occupation stamps of Serbia overpinted "Democratic Federative Yugoslavia"

Yugoslavia resumed its stamp issues in December 1944 with overprints of German occupation stamps of Serbia, followed in early 1945 by a series depicting Josip Broz Tito. In October, stamps with a different depiction of Tito were joined with view of partisans and the city of Jajce in a definitive series that would continue in use for the rest of the 1940s.

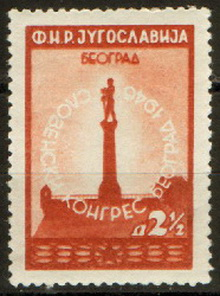
1946 stamp of the Federal People's Republic of Yugoslavia

The republic began frequent issues of pictorial and propaganda stamps from 1947 on. The definitive series of 1950 featured workers in a variety of industries, and was followed by additional stamps in different denominations and colors as late as 1955. Beginning in 1958, the definitives depicted industrial progress in various forms, with several re-issues, the last in 1966. In 1967, the 75th birthday of Tito was marked with a series of his profile, and new stamps of this design appeared until 1972.

== Breakup of Yugoslavia ==
In the aftermath of the Yugoslav Wars, two of the Yugoslav republics, Serbia and Montenegro, reconstituted as the "Federal Republic of Yugoslavia" in 1992. The breakup of Yugoslavia had little effect on its stamp issues, although most were sold only to collectors; the Scott catalog stops pricing used stamps dating from 1992 and later, a practice indicating lack of evidence for postal usage.

== Serbia and Montenegro ==
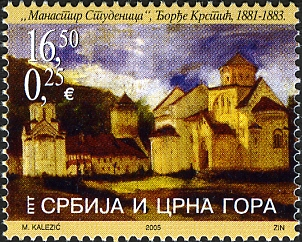
A 2005 stamp of Serbia and Montenegro

On 4 February 2003, a loose state union or confederacy, the State Union of Serbia and Montenegro, was created. On 3 April 2003, two stamps were issued with the new name of the state "Srbija i Crna Gora". Since Montenegro had adopted the euro in 2002, stamps of the confederation were denominated in both the Serbian dinar and the euro.

Following Montenegro's declaration of independence, the confederation was dissolved in June 2006.

== Istria issues ==
After the war, from 1945 to 1947, the former Italian-held Venezia Giulia was occupied by Allied Anglo-American troops (Zone "A" – the territory with the city of Trieste) and troops of the Yugoslav People's Army (Zone "B" – Istria and the Slovene Littoral). The zones of occupation were demarcated along the so-called Morgan Line. In Zone B, stamps inscribed "Istra Slovensko Primorje/Istria Littorale Sloveno" were issued in August 1945. Italy ceded most of those lands under Yugoslav administration to Yugoslavia following the Paris Peace Treaty in 1947.

== Free Territory of Trieste ==
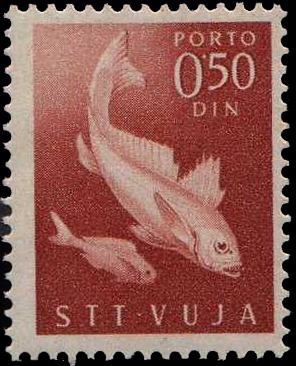
A stamp for Zone B of the Free territory of Trieste, 1950

The 1947 Peace Treaty established Trieste and the surrounding area as the Free Territory of Trieste, also divided into zones A and B, under Allied military administration and Yugoslav military administration, respectively. In Zone B, stamps inscribed "STT VUJA" ("Free territory of Trieste, Military Administration of the Yugoslav Army") were issued. The Free Territory was divided between Italy and Yugoslavia in 1954, with Zone B joining Yugoslavia.

== List of definite issues of Yugoslavia ==
Definite issues
Issue no.	Issue theme	Dates issued	Stamp example
Kingdom of Serbs, Croats and Slovenes
1	Regent Alexander and King Peter	16 January 1921	
2	King Alexander	23 January 1923 – 5 March 1924	
3	King Alexander	1 July 1924 – 5 June 1925	
4	King Alexander	25 January 1926 – 5 September 1933	
Kingdom of Yugoslavia
5	King Alexander	1 September 1931 – 4 November 1935	
6	King Peter II	6 September 1935 – 1 August 1938	
7	King Peter II	9 October 1939 – 1 November 1940	
Yugoslav government-in-exile
8	King Peter II	27 March 1943	
Democratic Federal Yugoslavia
9	Marshal Tito	21 February 1945 – 15 May 1945	
10	Partisan motifs	10 October 1945 – February 1950	
Federal People's Republic of Yugoslavia
11	Economy of Yugoslavia	1 September 1950 – 28 February 1955	
12	Capital cities and industry	24 March 1958 – 8 December 1976	
Socialist Federal Republic of Yugoslavia
13	Marshal Tito	25 May 1967 – 13 November 1978	
14	Touristic motifs	21 June 1971 – 16 April 1986	
15	Monuments of the Revolution	30 January 1974 – 1 June 1983	
16	Marshal Tito	26 March 1974 – 13 November 1978	
17	Postal traffic	17 March 1986 – 18 October 1993	
Federal Republic of Yugoslavia
18	Fountains	25 March 1992 – 28 November 2002	
19	Monasteries	15 August 1994 – 19 December 2002	

== See also ==
- Postage stamps and postal history of Bosnia and Herzegovina
- Postage stamps and postal history of Croatia
- Postage stamps and postal history of Macedonia
- Postage stamps and postal history of Montenegro
- Postage stamps and postal history of Serbia
- Postage stamps and postal history of Slovenia

== References and sources ==
Sources

- Scott catalogue
- Rossiter, Stuart & John Flower. The Stamp Atlas. London: Macdonald, 1986, pp. 117–119. ISBN 0-356-10862-7
