= Verigar issue =

Slovenian postage stamp series

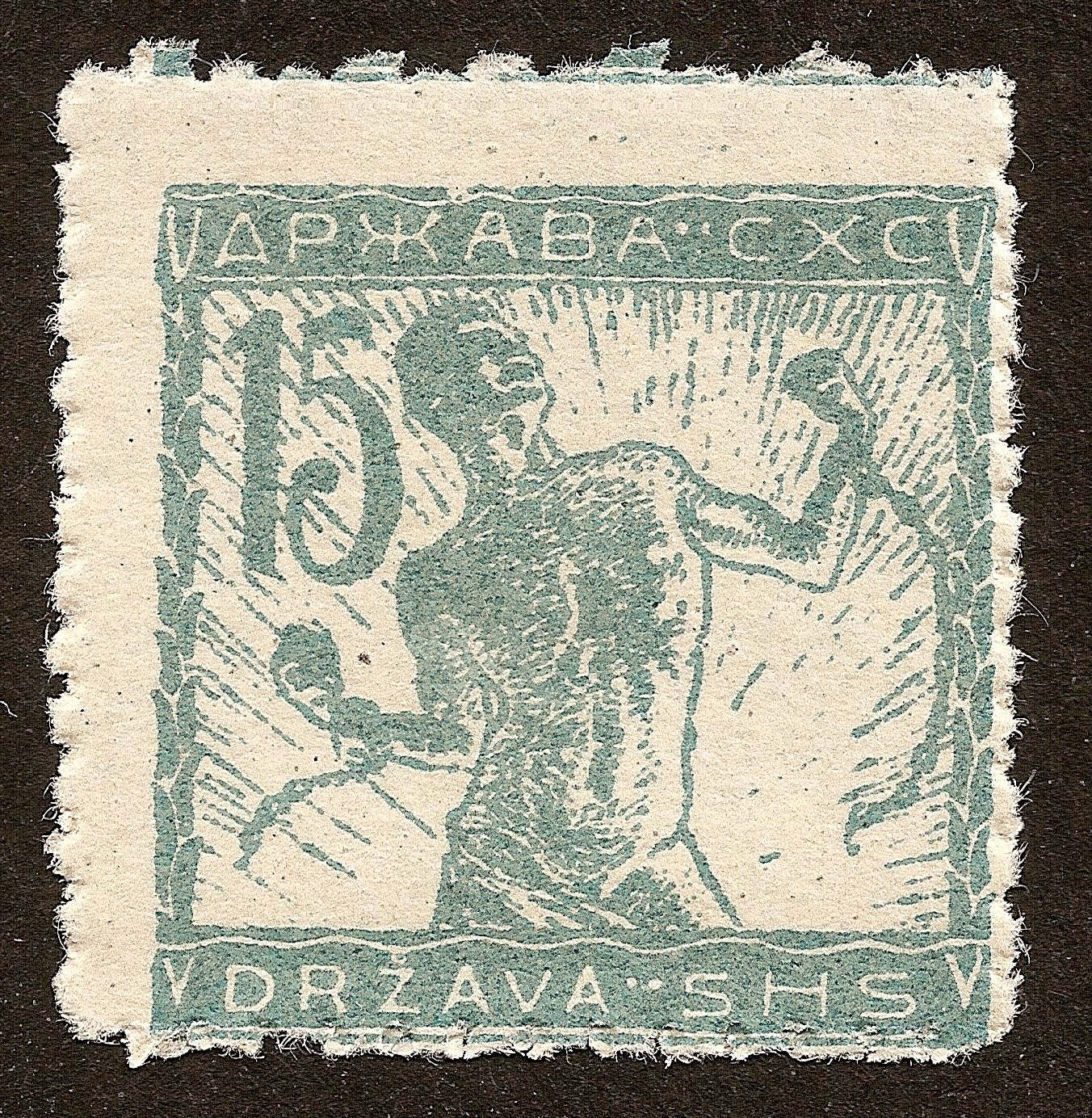
15-heller value of the first printing

Verigar (from verige meaning "chains") was the first postage stamp series of the State of Slovenes, Croats and Serbs, issued in Slovenia after the dissolution of the Austro-Hungarian monarchy at the end of World War I. Although the State of Slovenes, Croats and Serbs was absorbed into the Kingdom of Serbs, Croats and Slovenes in late 1918, the Verigar issue was used on its territory until 1921.

The name of the stamp series is derived from the Slovene word veriga, meaning 'chain', as some stamps depict a slave breaking the chains. The scene symbolizes the liberation of the Slavic peoples from Austria-Hungary.

== Description ==
The values on the stamps were presented in the units of heller and krone (1 krone=100 heller). Later, a modified Verigar series was issued in June 1920 using the Yugoslav dinar values. All stamps in the Verigar series were designed by the academy-trained painter Ivan Vavpotič. Smaller denomination stamps (3 to 40 heller and 5 to 15 para) depict a slave breaking his chains. The model for the design was gymnast Stane Derganc. In 1925, Vavpotič regretted the choice of the motif because he found it kitschy. On the smaller size stamps (3 to 15 heller), the man is visible from the waist up, and on larger size stamps (20 to 40 heller), the whole figure is depicted. Stamps of 50 and 60 heller and 40 to 60 para depict an allegory of Yugoslavia, a woman holding three falcons. Stamps of 1 and 2 krone depict an angel with olive stick. Stamps of 5 krone and up and 1 dinar and up depict Peter I of Yugoslavia.

The stamps with the slave man design include the abbreviated name of the State of Slovenes, Croats and Serbs written in Serbian Cyrillic and Gaj's Latin script ("Држава СХС" - "Država SHS"). Stamps with other designs and all dinar stamps include the name "Kingdom of Serbs, Croats and Slovenes" either full or abbreviated.

== History ==
The first stamps of the series were designed in late 1918 in Ljubljana during the short-lived State of Slovenes, Croats and Serbs, but were issued on 3 January 1919, after the creation of the Kingdom of Serbs, Croats and Slovenes. They were then published in different versions until 1920. They were used on the whole territory of the former State of Slovenes, Croats and Serbs until the first all-kingdom series of stamps was issued in 1921. Verigar series was printed several times, using different printing techniques, on 36 different types of paper, using different colors and with different perforation. Thus, there are numerous variants of every value.

=== First printing (Ljubljana lithography) ===
The first printing of the Verigar series (so called "Ljubljana lithography") was issued on 3 January 1919. The stamps were printed in the "I. Blaznik & heirs" printing house in Ljubljana using the lithographic technique. Eight different denominations were printed (3, 5, 10, 15, 20, 25, 30 and 40 heller). All bear the image of a slave breaking the chains. Different types of paper and different colors were used. Stamps of this printing are perforated.

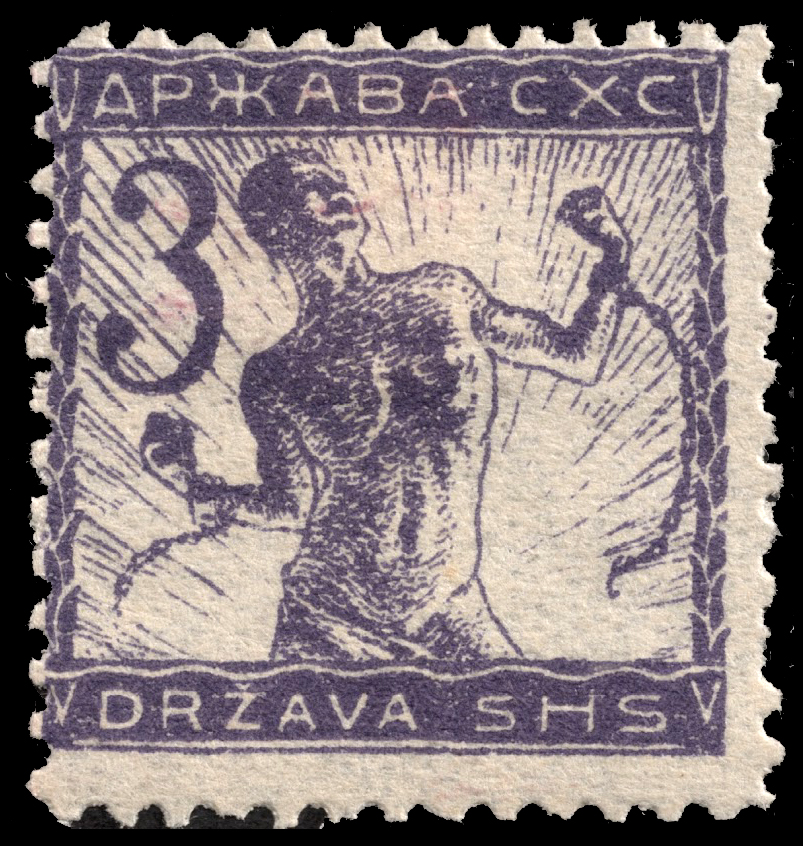
3 heller

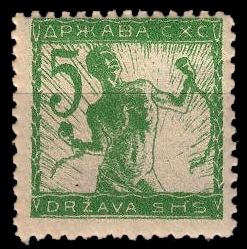
5 heller

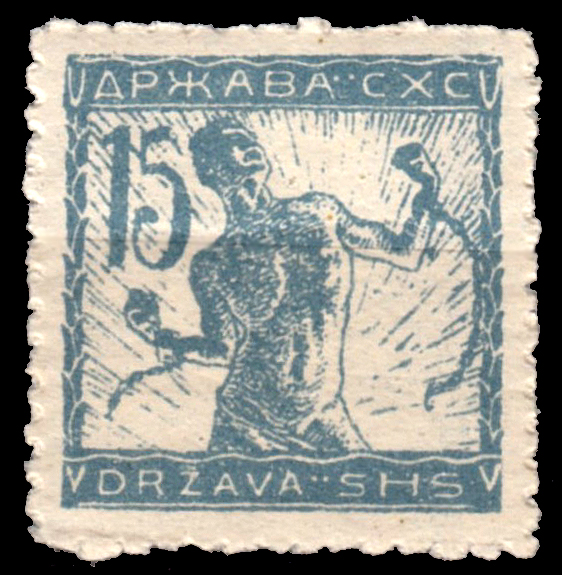
15 heller

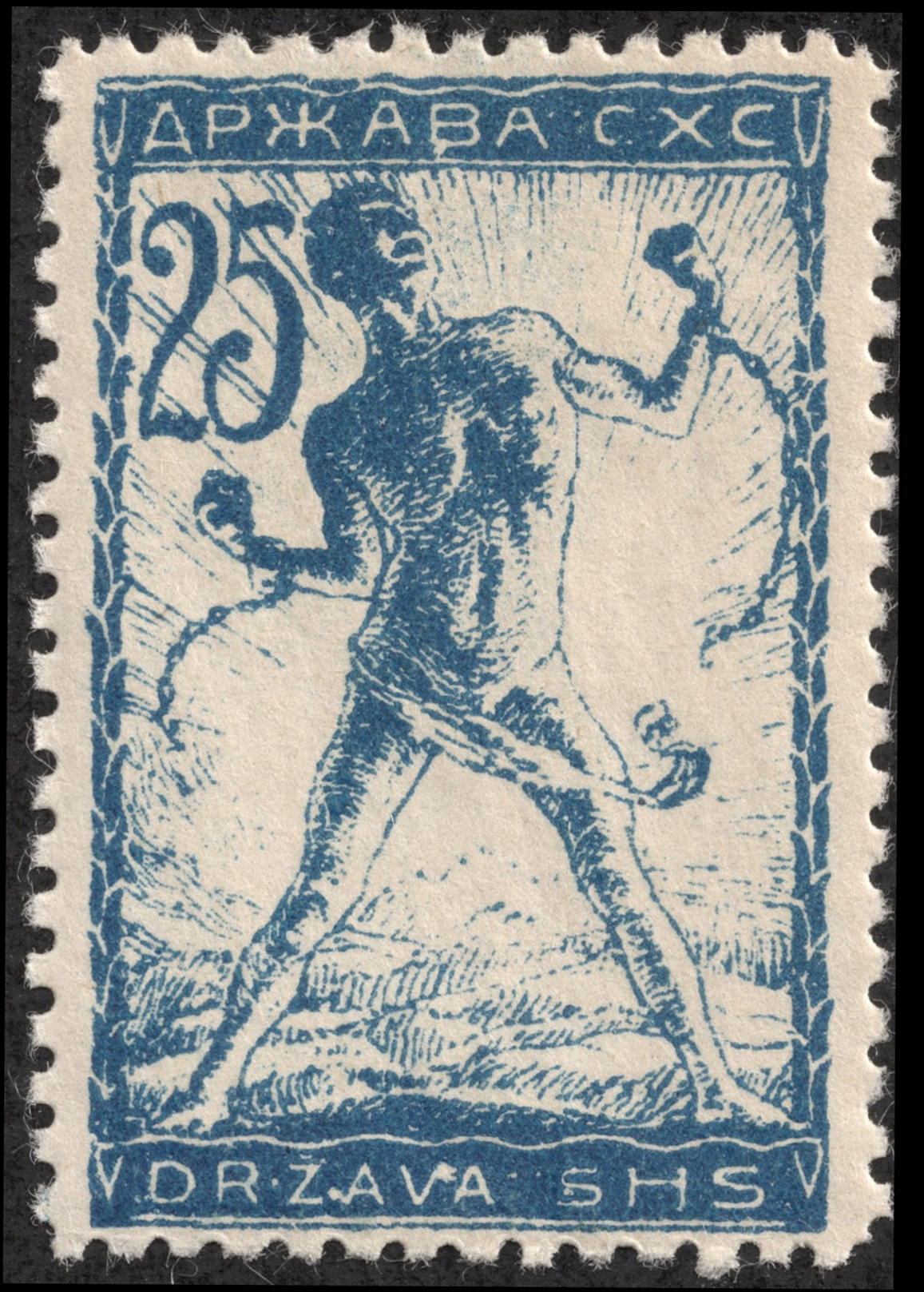
25 heller

=== Second printing (letterpress) ===
The second printing of the Verigar series was issued on 8 April 1919. This printing included 14 different denominations (3, 5, 10, 15, 20, 25, 30, 40, 50, 60 heller, 1, 2, 5 and 10 krone) with all four designs. Stamps were printed using the letterpress technique, some in the "Jugoslovenska tiskarna" printing house in Ljubljana, and some in the "A. Reisser & heirs" in Vienna. Different types of paper and different colors were used again. Some stamps are perforated, while some are rouletted.

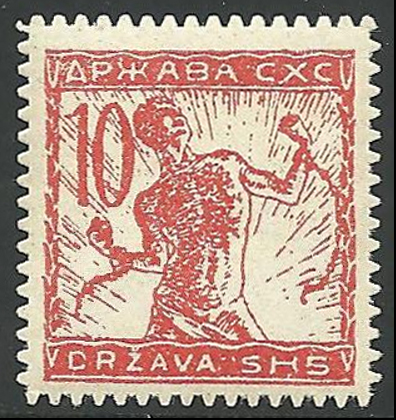
10 heller

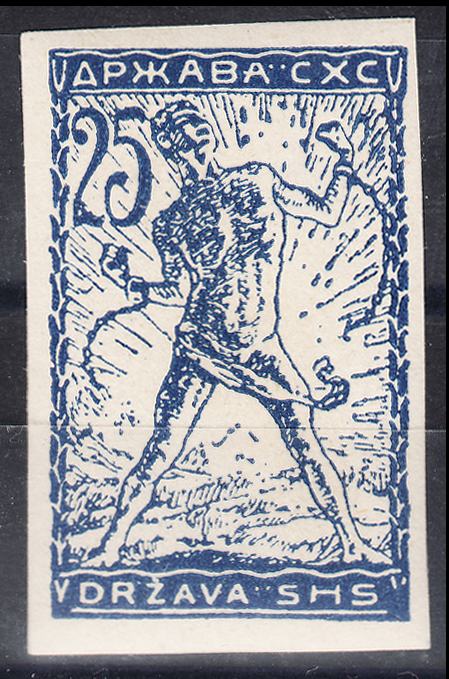
25 heller

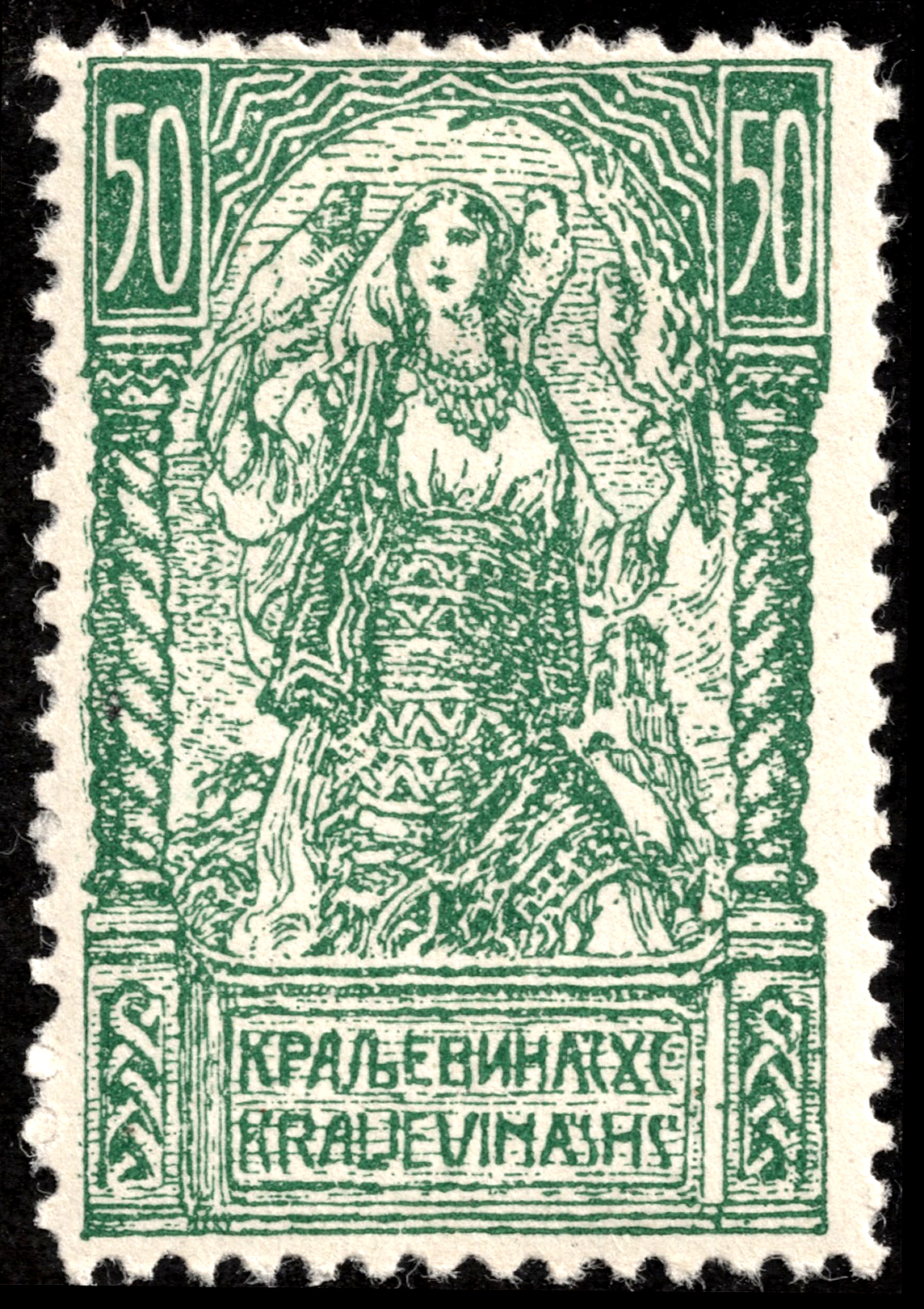
50 heller

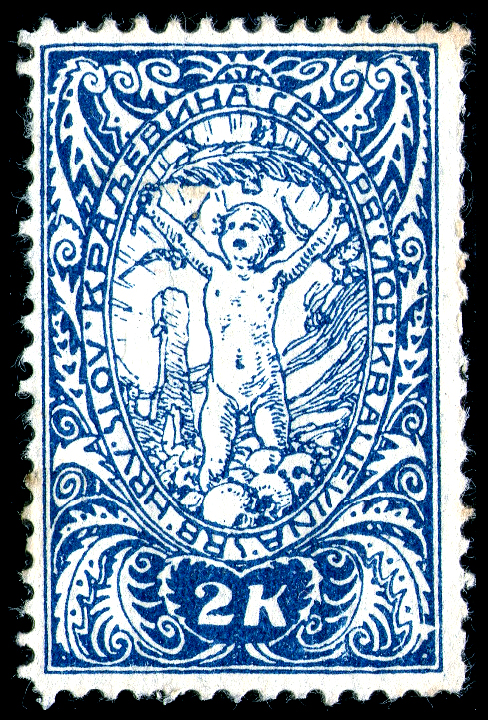
2 krone

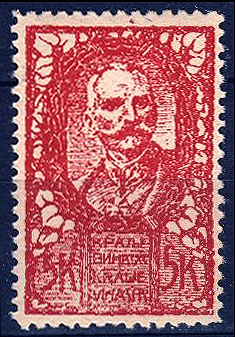
5 krone

Additionally, 15 and 20 krone stamps bearing the portrait of King Peter I were printed in Ljubljana using lithography technique and issued on 15 May 1920.

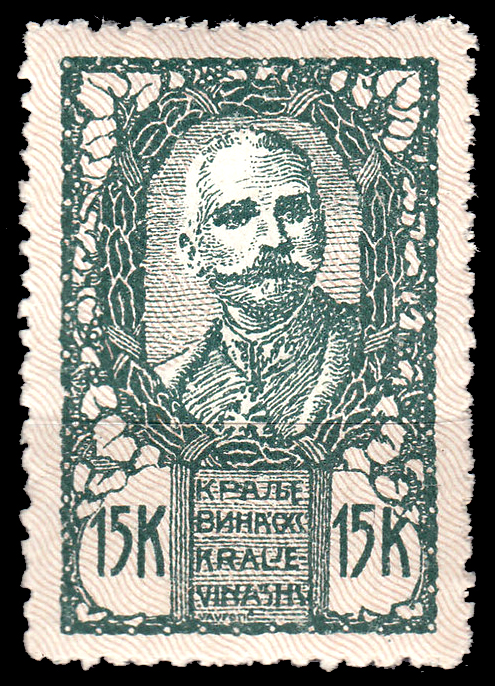
15 krone

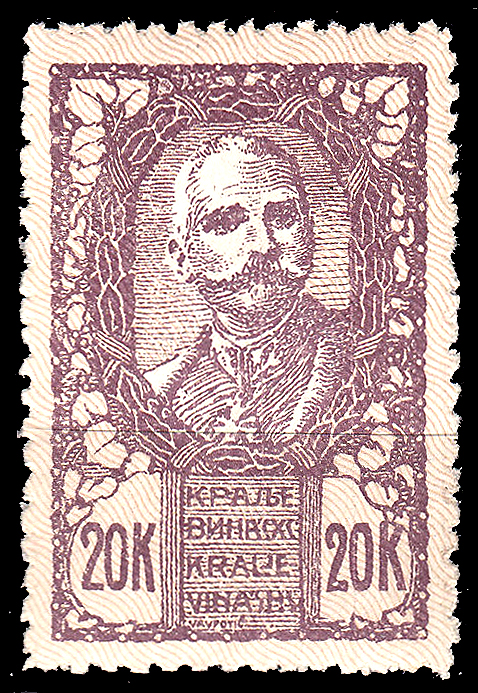
20 krone

=== Third printing (dinar issue) ===
Third printing of the Verigar series was issued on 24 June 1920. The stamps depict modified images of the slave man, woman with falcons and King Peter (without the angel), again designed by Vavpotič. It includes 14 different denominations, this time in Yugoslav dinars and paras (5, 10, 15, 20, 25, 40, 45, 50 and 60 paras, and 1, 2, 4, 6 and 10 dinars). Stamps of 2, 6 and 10 dinars were printed using the lithography technique, the others using the letterpress technique. Stamps up to 1 dinar value were rouletted, and those from 2 to 10 dinars were perforated.

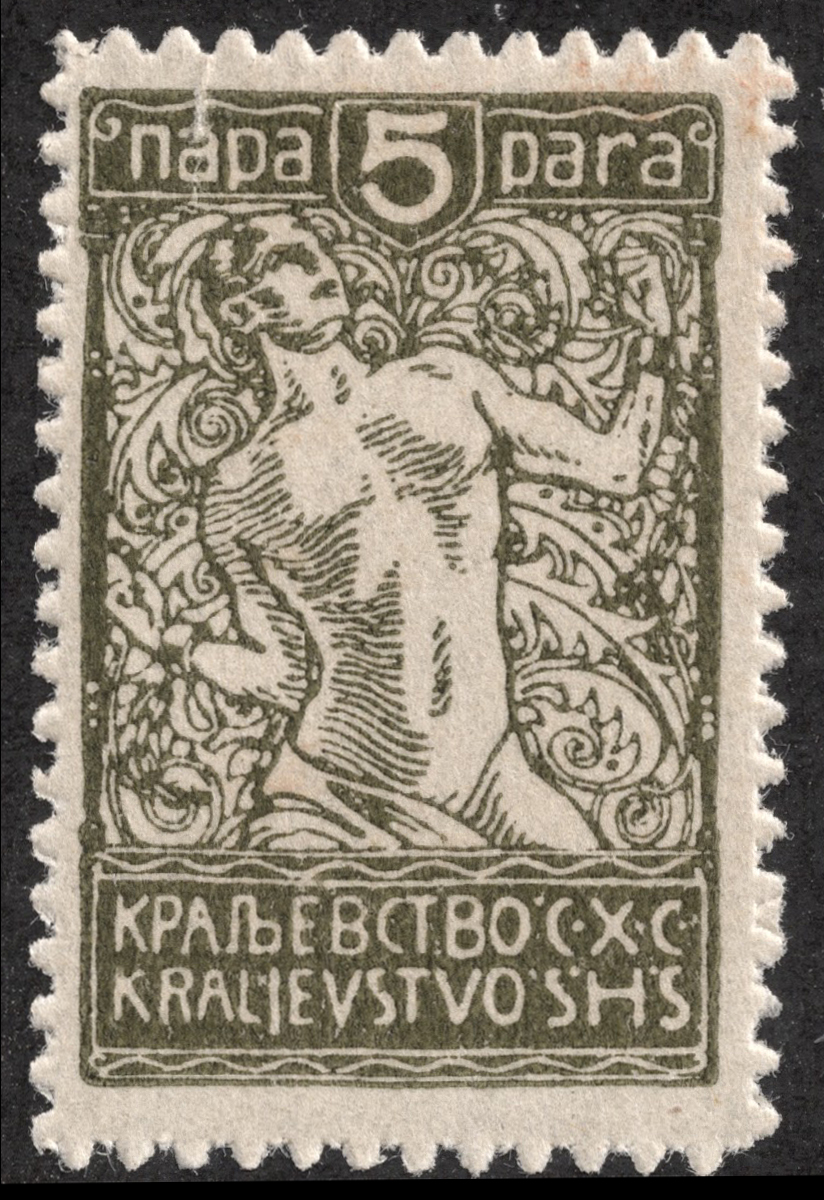
5 para

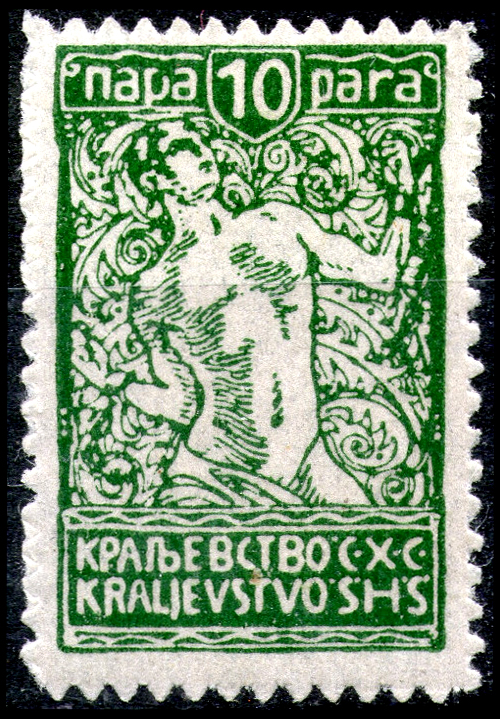
10 para

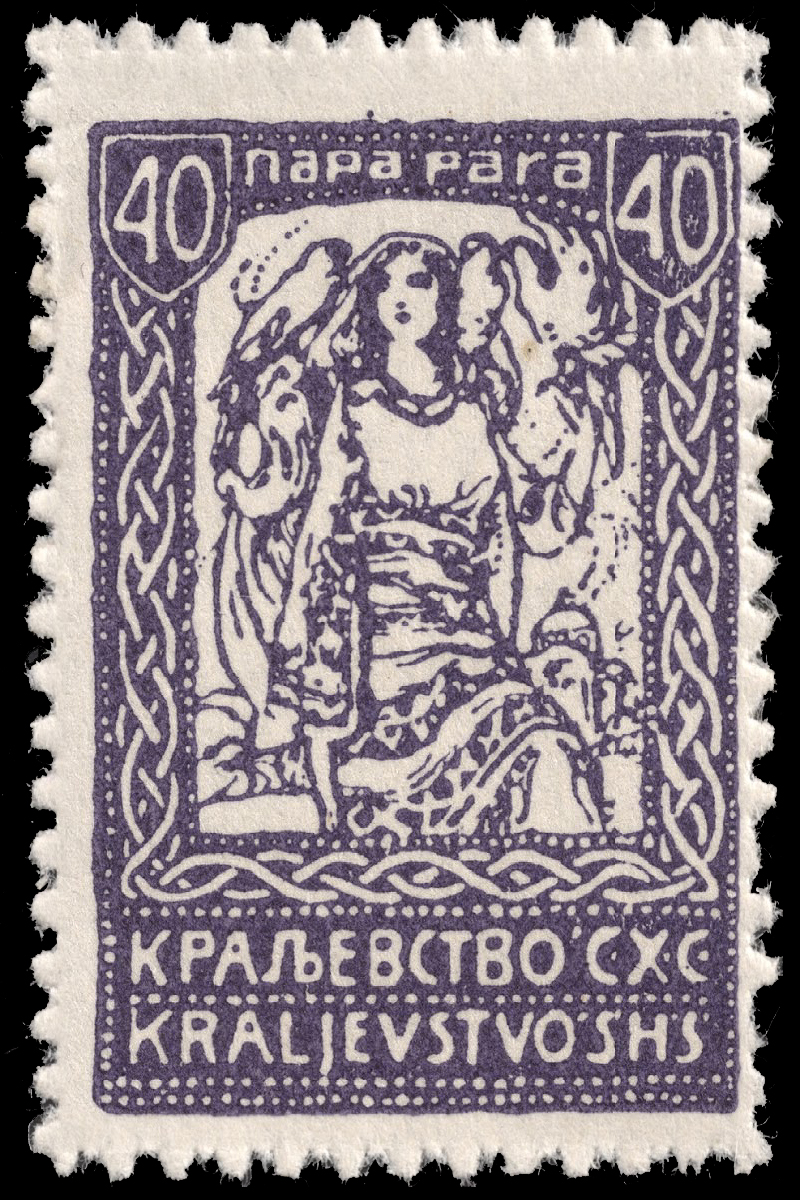
40 para

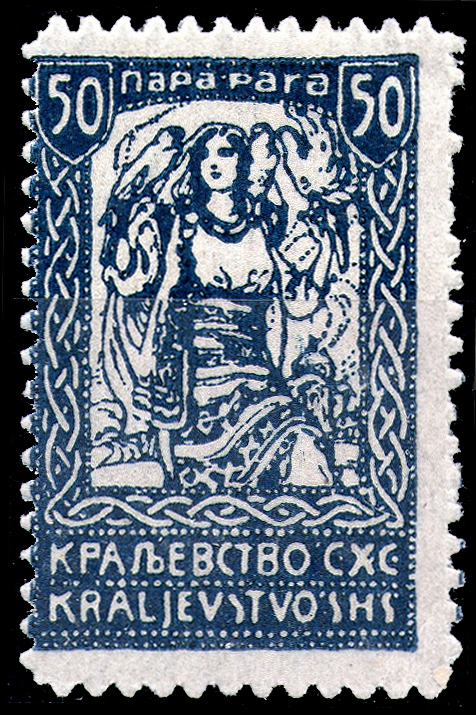
50 para

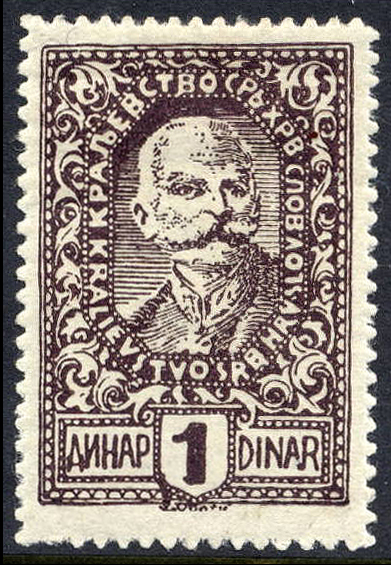
1 dinar

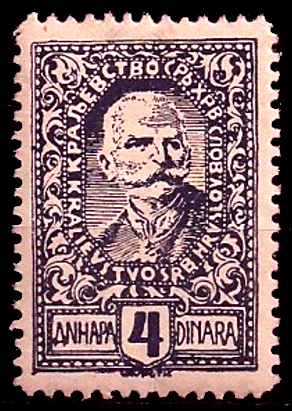
4 dinar

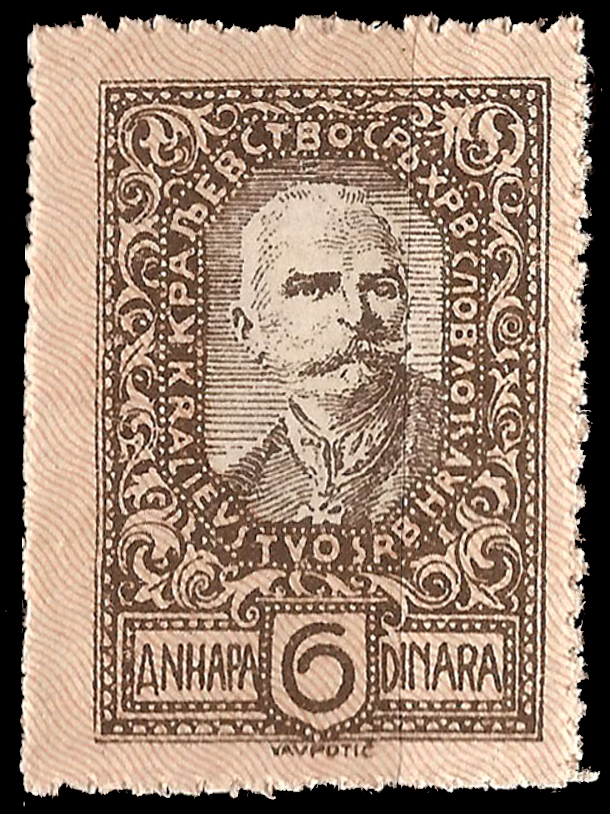
6 dinar

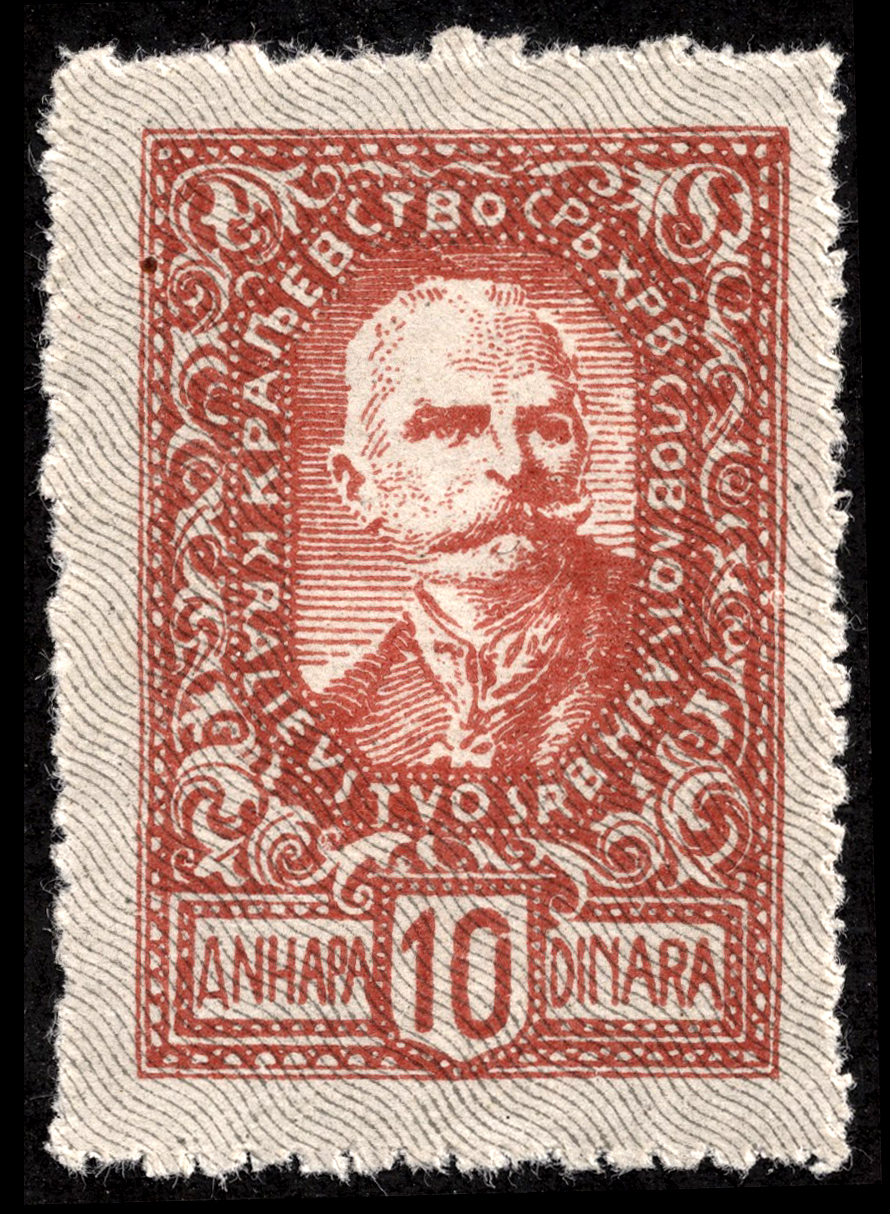
10 dinar

=== Postage due overprint ===
On 5 July 1920, a series of overprinted Verigar stamps was issued. Those were postage due stamps with modified denominations. The Verigar stamps of 15 and 30 hellers (from both first and second printing) were overprinted with the word PORTO (postage due) in both Cyrillic and Latin letters. New values were denominated in paras and dinars (5, 10, 20, 50 para and 1, 3, and 8 dinar).

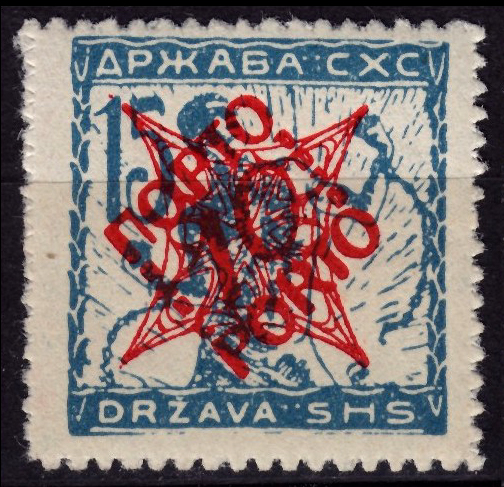
10 para on 15 heller

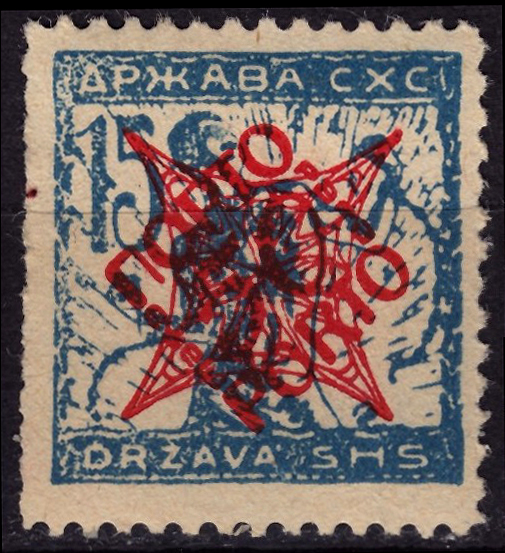
50 para on 15 heller

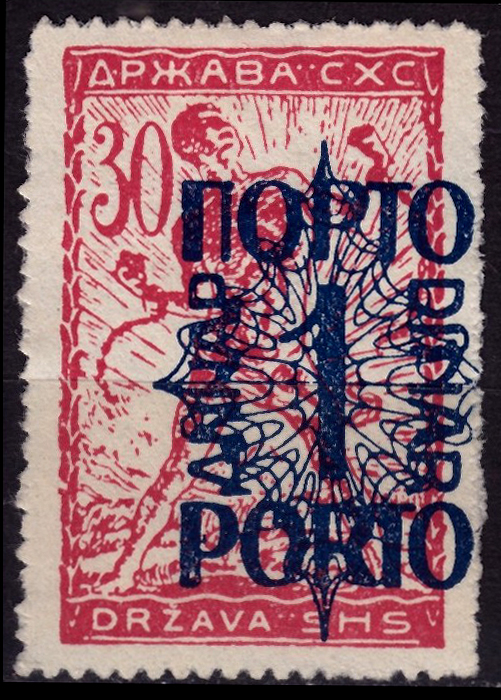
1 dinar on 30 heller

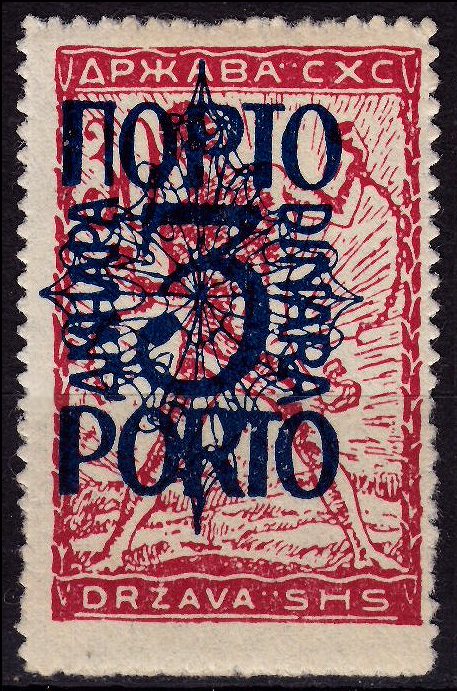
3 dinar on 30 heller

== Commemoration ==
On 19 March 1993, the Slovenian post office issued a new stamp using the Verigar man design to commemorate its 75th anniversary. Another commemorative stamp was published on the 90th anniversary of the series in 2009.

== See also ==
- Postage stamps and postal history of Yugoslavia
