= Outline of genocide studies =

Below is an outline of articles on the academic field of genocide studies and subjects closely and directly related to the field of genocide studies; this is not an outline of acts or events related to genocide or topics loosely or sometimes related to the field of genocide studies. The Event outlines section contains links to outlines of acts of genocide.

== Subjects ==
- Armenian genocide and the Holocaust
- Autogenocide
- Classicide
- Colonialism and genocide
- Command responsibility
- Cultural genocide
- Culture of violence theory
- Cumulative radicalization
- Death march
- Death squad
- Domicide
- Democide
- Denial of atrocities against indigenous peoples
- Effects of genocide on youth
- Eliticide
- Ethnic cleansing
- Ethnocide
- Eugenics
- Extermination camp
- Extermination through labour
- Femicide
- Forced assimilation
- Gendercide
- Genocidal massacre
- Genocidal intent
- Genocidal rape
- Genocide definitions
- Genocide denial
- Genocide education
- Genocide justification
- Genocide of indigenous peoples
- Genocide prevention
- Genocide recognition politics
- Genocides in history
- Incitement to genocide
- Mass killing
- Paper genocide
- Perpetrator studies
- Perpetrators, victims, and bystanders
- Rescuer (genocide)
- Pogrom
- Policide
- Political cleansing of population
- Politicide
- Population cleansing
- Population transfer
- Psychology of genocide
- Topocide
- Transgender genocide
- Utilitarian genocide
- War and genocide
- War crime

== Events ==
Below are articles about events which are related to the field of Genocide studies, not acts of genocide or actions which are related to genocide.

- International Conference on the Holocaust and Genocide

== Agreements ==
- Convention on the Prevention and Punishment of the Crime of Genocide
- List of parties to the Genocide Convention
- Rome Statute of the International Criminal Court
- United Nations General Assembly Resolution 96

== Individuals ==
Below are individuals who have made notable contributions to the field of genocide studies.

- Alison Des Forges
- Adam Jones (Canadian scholar)
- Alexander Laban Hinton
- Anthony Dirk Moses
- Barbara Harff
- Ben Kiernan
- Benjamin Valentino
- Christopher Browning
- Colin Tatz
- David Stannard
- Debórah Dwork
- Donald Bloxham
- Eric D. Weitz
- Gary J. Bass
- Gregory Gordon (lawyer)
- Gregory Stanton
- Guenter Lewy
- Iris Chang
- Irving Louis Horowitz
- Israel W. Charny
- Jack Nusan Porter
- James Waller
- Leo Kuper
- Lucy Dawidowicz
- Mark Levene
- Martin Gilbert
- Max Bergholz
- Michael Berenbaum
- Norman Naimark
- Nora Levin
- Patrick Wolfe
- Paul R. Bartrop
- Peter Balakian
- Raphael Lemkin
- Raul Hilberg
- Raymond Kévorkian
- Robert Melson (political scientist)
- Rudolph Rummel
- Saul Friedländer
- Samantha Power
- Samuel Totten
- Stephen G. Wheatcroft
- Taner Akçam
- Ted Gurr
- Timothy D. Snyder
- Uğur Ümit Üngör
- Vahakn Dadrian
- Ward Churchill
- Yehuda Bauer

== Organisations ==
Below are organisations which are centered on the subject of genocide studies.

- International Association of Genocide Scholars
- International Network of Genocide Scholars

== Books and publications ==
Books

- Blood and Soil
- Extremely Violent Societies
- Final Solutions
- The Creation of Dangerous Violent Criminals
- The Problems of Genocide

Journals

- Journal of Genocide Research
- Genocide Studies and Prevention

== Lists ==
- Genocides in history
- Genocides in history (before World War I)
- Genocides in history (World War I through World War II)
- Genocides in history (1946 to 1999)
- Genocides in history (21st century)
- Genocide of indigenous peoples
- List of ethnic cleansing campaigns
- List of genocides

== Outlines of events ==
This section for outlines of genocidal events.

- Outline of the Armenian genocide
- Outline and timeline of the Greek genocide
- Outline of the Cambodian genocide
- Outline of the Holocaust
- Outline of the Holodomor
- Outline of World War II § Genocide

== Bibliographies of events ==
- Bibliography of the Armenian genocide
- Bibliography of the Cambodian genocide
- Bibliography of the Greek genocide
- Bibliography of the Holocaust
- Bibliography of the Holodomor

== See also ==
- Bibliography of genocide studies
- Crimes against humanity
- Holocaust studies
- War crime
