= Genocidal massacre =

Small-scale massacres with genocidal component

The term genocidal massacre was introduced by Leo Kuper (1908–1994) to describe incidents which have a genocidal component but are committed on a smaller scale when they are compared to genocides such as the Rwandan genocide. Others such as Robert Melson, who also makes a similar differentiation, class genocidal massacres as "partial genocide".

== Definitions ==
This is a list of scholarly definitions of genocidal massacre, a phrase coined by Leo Kuper.

Kuper argued that it is important to retain the basic concept of genocidal murder, that it is not helpful to create entirely new definitions when there exists an internationally recognized definition and a Genocide Convention that might provide the basis for some effective action, ... he argued that basically all mass killing is genocide, but at the same time the word massacre can be added to convey a more limited range of mass killing.

— Jennifer Balint and Israel Charny.

Date	Author	Definition
1982	Leo Kuper	Genocidal massacres, expressed characteristically in the annihilation of a section of a group—men, women and children, as for example in the wiping out of whole villages.
1994	Israel Charny	Mass killing as defined ... in the generic definition of genocide, but in which the mass murder is on a smaller scale, that is, smaller numbers of human beings are killed.
2007	Ben Kiernan	This seventh category, unspecified in the 1948 convention, comprises shorter, limited episodes of killing directed at specific local or regional community, targeted because of its membership in a larger group.

== Role of the state ==
In his book Blood and Soil, Ben Kiernan states that genocidal massacres can be state-organized, communal, or a combination of both.

- State-organized: imperial powers have often committed genocidal massacres to control difficult minorities within their empires. For example, when Jews rioted in Alexandria in 68 AD in support of Jews who were taking part in the First Jewish–Roman War, the Roman governor Tiberius Julius Alexander massacred 50,000 to quell the riots.
- Communal strife: example is the 1577 massacre in the Uamh Fhraing of the Clan MacLeod by MacDonald raiders; the next year MacLeods retaliated by massacring the MacDonalds in Trumpan Church.
- Communal strife, assisted by the state: in response to a train fire, the police in Gujarat helped Hindu nationalist gangs to massacre 800–2,000 people, mostly Muslims, and raping Muslim women. The government of Gujarat was accused of covering up the state's role in the massacres.

== Scholarly discussion ==
Ben Kiernan states that some genocidal massacres are carried out against groups that are not covered by the Genocide Convention—such as being a member of a political party, or social class—but that these are covered under local laws and international treaties that criminalise crimes against humanity. However he does acknowledge that massacres against groups other than those in the Genocide Convention, and where the intention of the perpetrators did not specifically intend to commit genocide, are a grey area.

William Schabas makes the point that genocidal massacres are criminal offences under international law as a crime against humanity, and during an armed conflict under the laws of war. However he points out that international prosecutions for individual acts are not covered by the Rome Statute (which brought into existence the International Court of Justice) because crimes against humanity must be "widespread or systematic" and war crimes usually have to have a threshold above the individual crime "in particular when committed as part of a plan or policy or as part of a large-scale commission of such crimes".

Irving Louis Horowitz is critical of Kuper's approach. He cites Kuper's use of the term genocidal massacre to describe the inter-communal violence during the partition of India and during The Troubles in Northern Ireland. Hirsh states "to speak of [these] as genocidal in a context of religious competition and conflict risks diluting the notion of genocide and equating it with any conflict between national, religious, or racial groups".

== See also ==
- Outline of genocide studies
- Ten stages of genocide
- Genocide studies
- Rwandan genocide
