= Perpetrators, victims, and bystanders =

Classification of those involved in a genocide

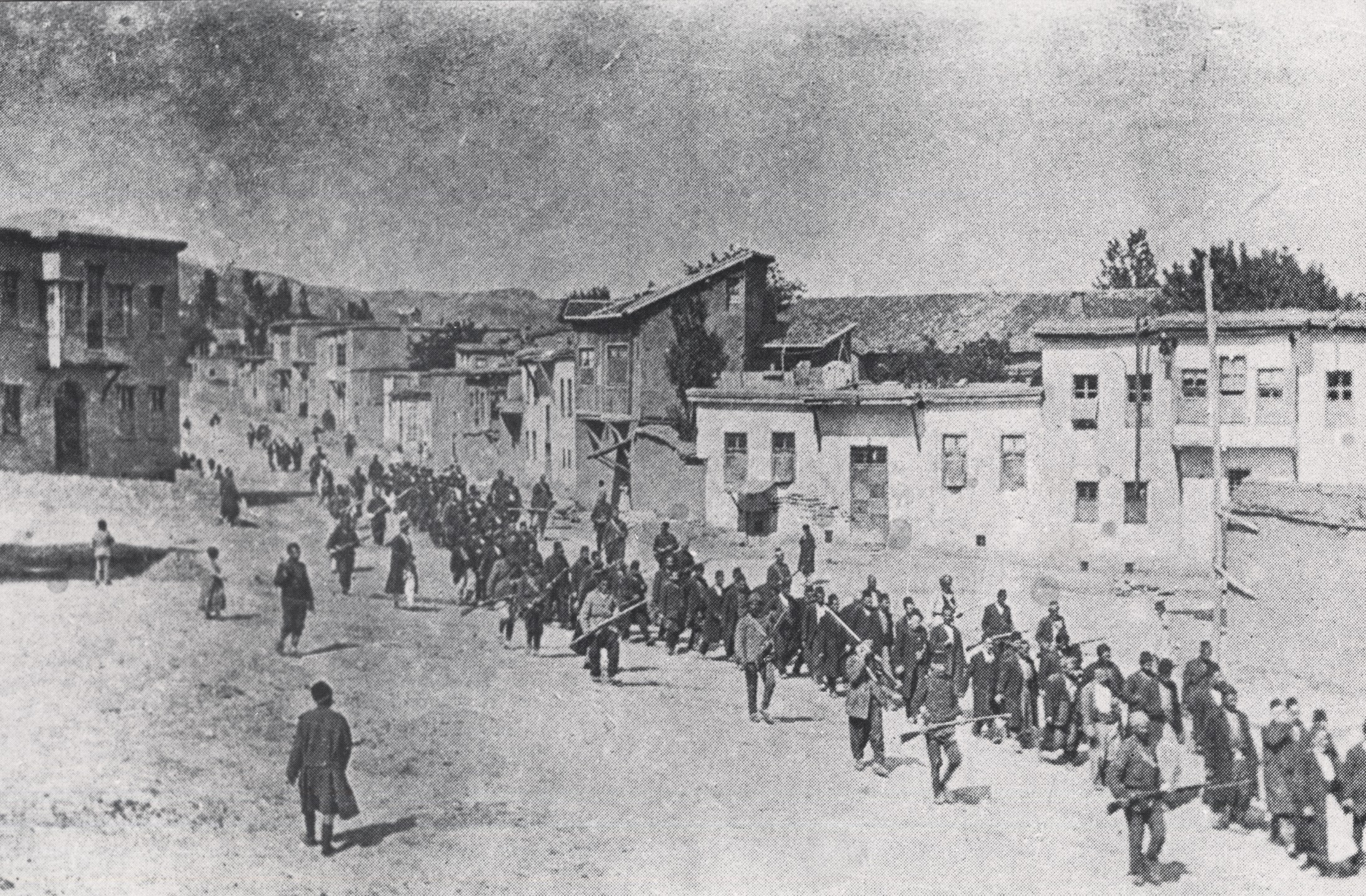
Ottoman soldiers (perpetrators) june Armenian civilians (victims) through Harput (Kharpert) to a prison in nearby Mezireh (Elazığ), April 1915, during the Armenian genocide. Bystanders can also be seen in the photograph.

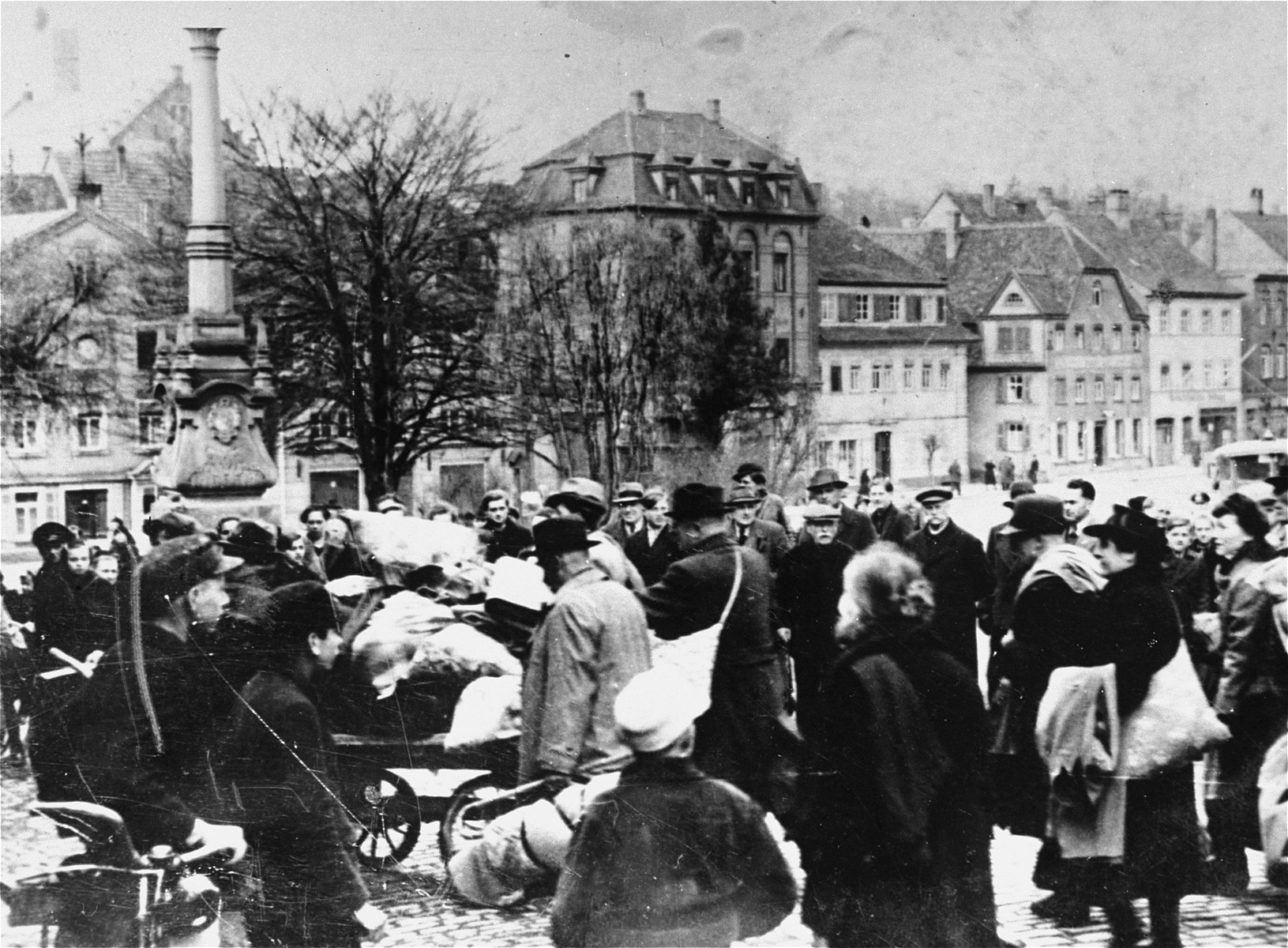
In this photograph showing the deportation of Jews from Kitzingen, Jewish victims are shown with local non-Jewish bystanders and policemen (perpetrators).

In genocide studies, perpetrators, victims, and bystanders is an evolving typology for classifying the participants and observers of a genocide. The typology was first proposed by Raul Hilberg in the 1992 book Perpetrators Victims Bystanders: Jewish Catastrophe 1933–1945. Anthropologist Alexander Hinton credits work on this theory with sparking widespread public intolerance of mass violence, calling it a "proliferation of a post-cold war human rights regime that demanded action in response to atrocity and accountability for culprits.". The triad is also used in studying the psychology of genocide. It has become a key element of scholarship on genocide, with subsequent researchers refining the concept and applying it to new fields.

Initial analyses of atrocities such as the Holocaust discussed these events simply as violence by perpetrators against victims. Scholars added the category of "bystander" to include people who impact, and are impacted by, mass violence but who are not clearly perpetrators or victims. Even with this added complexity, most genocide research focuses on perpetrators, in part because evidence of their behavior is most accessible to scholars. While research about bystanders' role in violence dates to the mid twentieth century, research about their role in genocide is more recent. Just as emerging research has added complexity to the triad as a whole, it continues to recognize nuance in each of the three roles.

Some researchers are expanding the triad and the situations to which the concept applies. For example, Jan Gross proposed that helpers and beneficiaries be added to the classification. The template of perpetrators, victims, and bystanders is also being applied to cyberbullying and sexual assault on college campuses. Studies of the Bystander effect and Bystander intervention have significant overlap with the study of the perpetrators, victims, and bystanders triad.

== Perpetrators ==
Although it may seem clear who a "perpetrator" might be in an atrocity or act of violence, defining it specifically helps underscore why experts warn against assessing an atrocity as a simple battle between good and evil. Robert M. Ehrenreich and Tim Cole add to earlier scholarship from Raul Hilberg with their specific "prerequisites" for applying the perpetrator-victim-bystander triad. They also recognize that perpetrators are the most studied category, because perpetrators leave the most evidence. Ehrenreigh and Cole's definition of perpetrator, and use of these prerequisites, is heavily cited by other scholars. Their four prerequisities include the following:

1. Perpetrators hold the most power in the area where the conflict is taking place. In addition to power, they must have "legitimacy, authority, and control within the region."
2. Conflict, which Ehrenreich and Cole describe as "An actual or contrived stress must exist within the population of the region, which the perpetrators can exploit [to motivate support for their violence]."
3. The perpetrators blame this "actual or contrived stress" on a specific category of people. This category is "constructed": in other words, it is not naturally occurring and the individuals within the category created by the perpetrators might not consider themselves to be grouped in the same way. It might even defy evidence at hand to assert that those individuals genuinely constitute a single homogenous group separate from others. Because of this power, Ehrenreich and Cole emphasize, "These characteristics allow the perpetrators to dictate ethnic identity."
4. The groupings of perpetrator, victim, and bystander end when the act(s) of violence end.

The severity of a mass atrocity often relates to how rapidly perpetrators identify their victims and spring into mass violence. Using the Rwandan genocide as an example, Ehrenreich and Cole point out, "A rapid rate of destruction is preferable for the perpetrator group because it allots the least amount of time and therefore the fewest options for reaction by the victim group."

== Victims ==
Part of defining themselves and fabricating boundaries between the victim group and the overall population, perpetrators bring victims into a group of which they might not otherwise consider themselves a member, and separate them from groups to which they previously belonged. Even where the victims are not killed in mass violence, this "otherness" places them at risk for other forms of elimination such as cultural genocide or forced assimilation. In these ways, the victim group might be eliminated even if individuals from the group remain alive, which on its own meets several definitions of genocide.

Victims are in part defined by their apparent lack of choices in the face of perpetrators' violence. Ehrenreich and Cole describe the victims' place in mass atrocity this way: "The spectrum for the victim group is not one of power or action (i.e., degree of involvement in or avoidance of the destruction process) but reaction. The only decisions open to the victim group are what survival strategies to attempt at any given moment in order to avoid an immediate or impending action by the perpetrator group." They go on to explain that victims' options are directly proportional to how rapidly the perpetrators are able to advance their acts of violence.

== Bystanders ==
Most researchers admit the role of "bystander" is the most complex and dynamic of the perpetrator-victim-bystander triad. Giorgia Donà explains the bystander category in her 2018 research about the Rwandan Genocide as people who "neither partake in the act of violence nor flee from it." She emphasizes the fluidity of the bystander role, noting:

Boundaries between [roles] are often unclear and blurred and can change over time and across space. While certain identities may become characterized by their bystanding behaviours, it is important to note that bystanding is a behaviour and not a fixed identity, and thus one's status as a bystander may change depending on personal circumstances or volitions.

A person, therefore, might shift between perpetrator, victim, and bystander roles. Furthermore, their bystander behavior may be influenced by the relative danger or safety of shifting to perpetrator or victim roles. Ehrenreich and Cole explain bystanders have options "to support [or] avoid the perpetrator group" and to influence perpetrators and the violent event itself through "overt (e.g., petitions or demonstrations of public opinion) or covert (e.g., resistance) actions." They also note that, in genocide, bystanders are excluded from the ethnic group perpetrators designate for destruction. Finally, bystanders might also benefit from annihilation of the victim group by acquiring property confiscated from victims. Bystanders, therefore, remains one of the most complex categories of this triad.

== See also ==
- Abuse
- Crimes against humanity
- Exploitation
- Gang rape
- Gaza genocide
- Génocidaires
- Live streaming of sexual molestation
- Responsibility to protect
- Sexual violence
- Slavery
- The Creation of Dangerous Violent Criminals, book by Lonnie H. Athens
- Torture
