= Extermination through labour =

Killing prisoners by means of forced labour

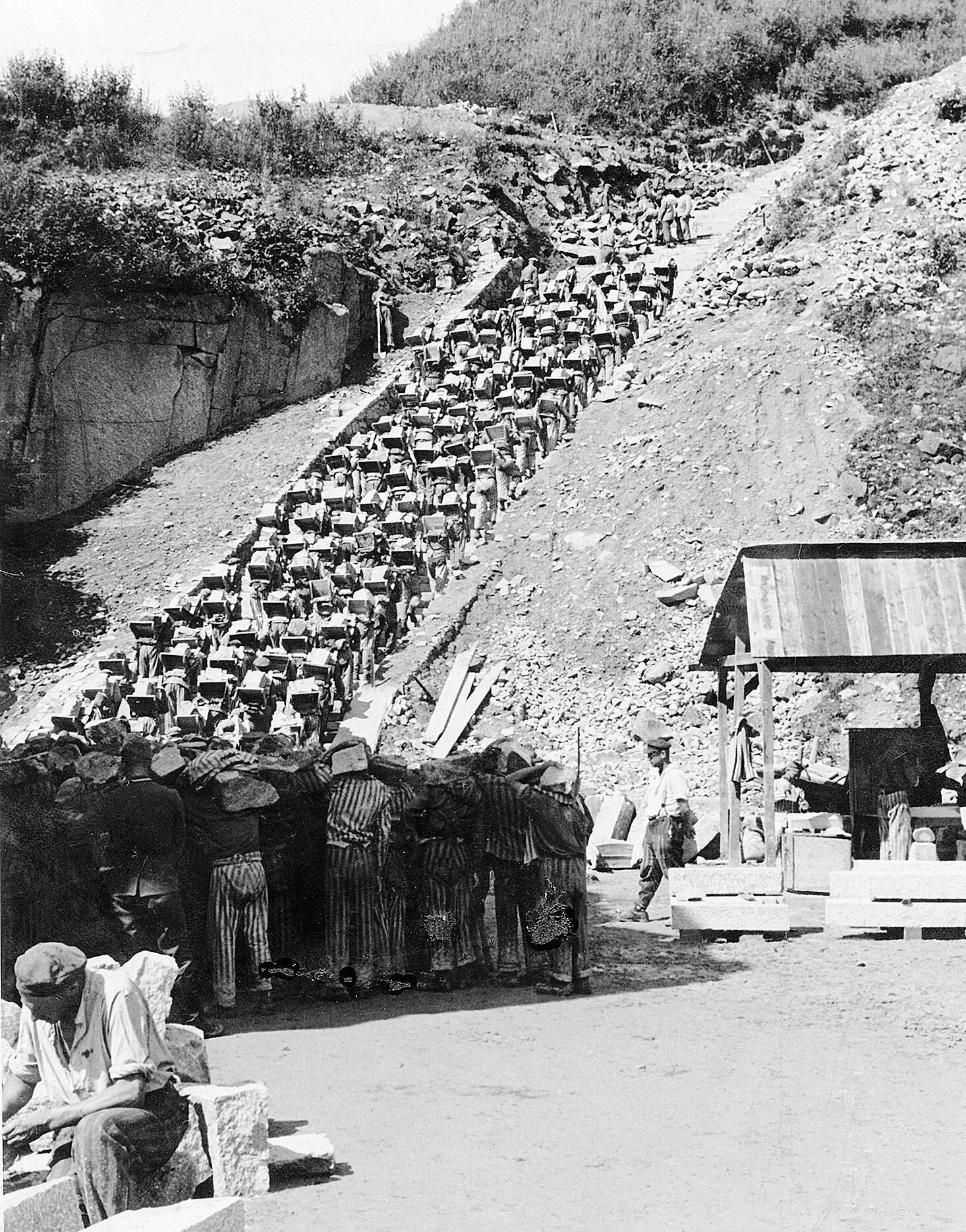
The Todesstiege ("Stairs of Death") at the Mauthausen concentration camp quarry in Upper Austria. Inmates were forced to carry heavy rocks up the stairs. In their severely weakened state, few prisoners could cope with this back-breaking labour for long.

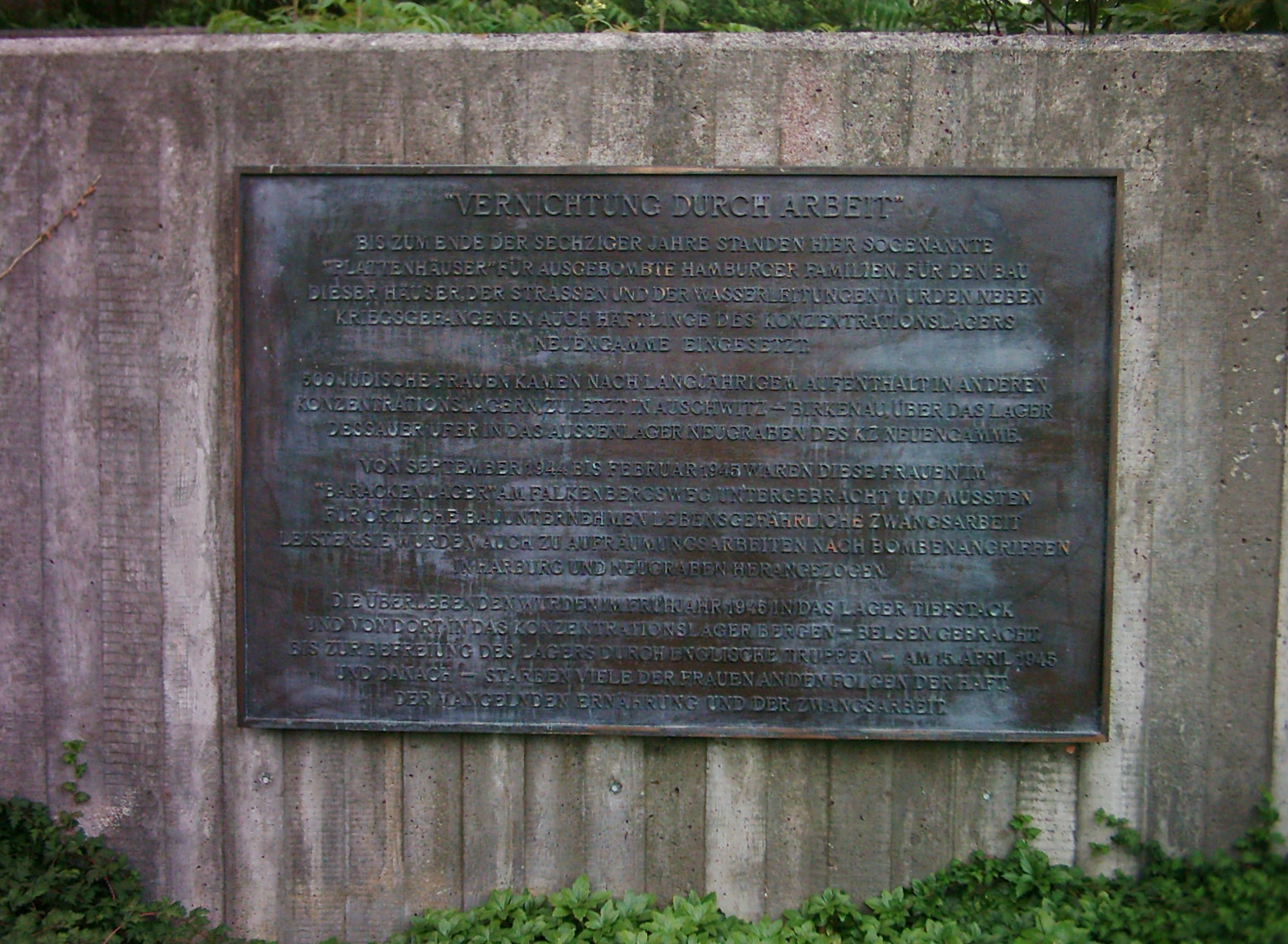
Commemorative plaque in Hamburg-Neugraben

Extermination through labour (or "extermination through work", German: Vernichtung durch Arbeit) is a term that was adopted to describe forced labor in Nazi concentration camps whose inmates were held in inhumane conditions and suffered a high mortality rate; in some camps most prisoners died within a few months of incarceration. In the 21st century, research has questioned whether there was a general policy of extermination through labor in the Nazi concentration camp system because of widely varying conditions between camps. German historian Jens-Christian Wagner argues that the camp system involved the exploitation of forced labor of some prisoners and the systematic murder of others, especially Jews, with only limited overlap between these two groups.

Some writers, notably Aleksandr Solzhenitsyn, have written that the Soviet Gulag system was also a form of extermination through labour.

== Terminology ==
The term "extermination through labour" (Vernichtung durch Arbeit) was not generally used by the Nazi SS. However, it was specifically employed by Joseph Goebbels and Otto Georg Thierack in late 1942 negotiations involving them, Albert Bormann, and Heinrich Himmler, relating to the transfer of prisoners to concentration camps. The phrase was used again during the post-war Nuremberg trials.

In the 1980s and 1990s, historians began debating the appropriate use of the term. Falk Pingel believed the phrase should not be applied to all Nazi prisoners, while Hermann Kaienburg and Miroslav Kárný believed "extermination through labour" was a consistent goal of the SS. More recently, Jens-Christian Wagner has also argued that not all Nazi prisoners were targeted with annihilation. Wagner states, "As a metaphor for moral indignation, the use of the term 'annihilation through labour' by historians may be completely understandable, but it is not particularly helpful in an analytical sense, since it implies an ideological programme and, in doing so, disregards the impetus of contingent factors which emerged in the course of the war."

== In Nazi Germany ==
The Nazis persecuted many individuals because of their race, political affiliation, disability, religion, or sexual orientation. Groups marginalized by the majority population in Germany included welfare-dependent families with many children, alleged vagrants and transients, as well as members of perceived problem groups, such as alcoholics and prostitutes. While these people were considered "German-blooded", they were also categorized as "social misfits" (Asoziale) as well as superfluous "ballast-lives" (Ballastexistenzen). They were recorded in lists (as were homosexuals) by civil and police authorities and subjected to myriad state restrictions and repressive actions, which included forced sterilization and ultimately imprisonment in concentration camps. Anyone who openly opposed the Nazi regime (such as communists, social democrats, democrats, and conscientious objectors) was detained in prison camps. Many of them did not survive the ordeal.

While others could possibly redeem themselves in the eyes of the Nazis, Germany encouraged and supported emigration of Jews to Palestine and elsewhere from 1933 until 1941 with arrangements such as the Haavara Agreement, or the Madagascar Plan. In 1942, during the war, the Nazi leadership gathered to discuss what had come to be called "the final solution to the Jewish question" at a conference in Wannsee, Germany. The transcript of this gathering gives historians insight into the thinking of the Nazi leadership as they devised the details of the Jews' future destruction, including using extermination through labour as one component of their so-called "Final Solution".

Under proper leadership, the Jews shall now in the course of the Final Solution be suitably brought to their work assignments in the East. Able-bodied Jews are to be led to these areas to build roads in large work columns separated by sex, during which a large part will undoubtedly drop out through a process of natural reduction. As it will undoubtedly represent the most robust portion, the possible final remainder will have to be handled appropriately, as it would constitute a group of naturally-selected individuals, and would form the seed of a new Jewish resistance.

— Wannsee Protocol, 1942.

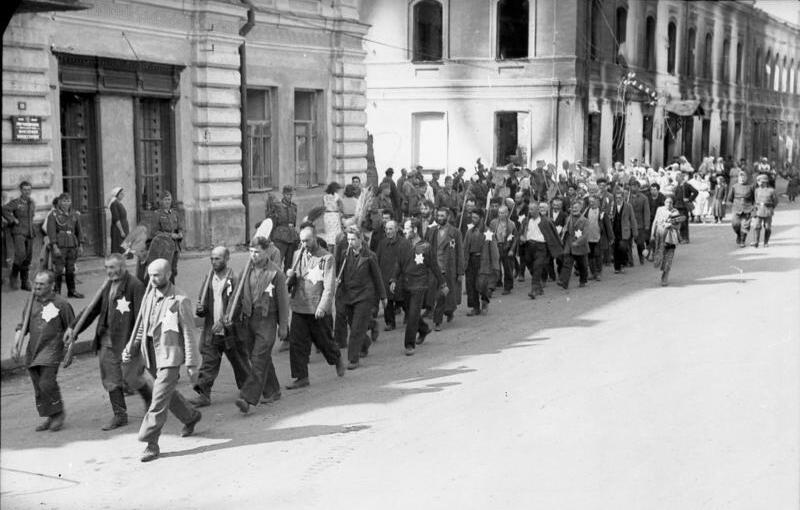
Jewish forced labourers, marching with shovels, Mogilev, 1941

In Nazi camps, "extermination through labour" was principally carried out through what was characterized at the Nuremberg Trials as "slave work" and "slave workers", in contrast with the forced labour of foreign work forces.

Working conditions included no remuneration of any kind, constant surveillance, physically demanding labour (for example, road construction, farm work, and factory work, particularly in the arms industry), excessive working hours (often 10 to 12 hours per day), minimal nutrition, food rationing, lack of hygiene, poor medical care and ensuing disease, and insufficient clothing (for example, summer clothes even in the winter).

Torture and physical abuse were also used. Torstehen ("door standing") forced victims to stand outside naked with arms raised. When they collapsed or passed out, they would be beaten until they re-assumed the position. Pfahlhängen ("post attachment") involved tying the inmate's hands behind their back and then hanging them by their hands from a tall stake. This would dislocate and disjoint the arms, and the pressure would be fatal within hours.

=== Concentration camps ===
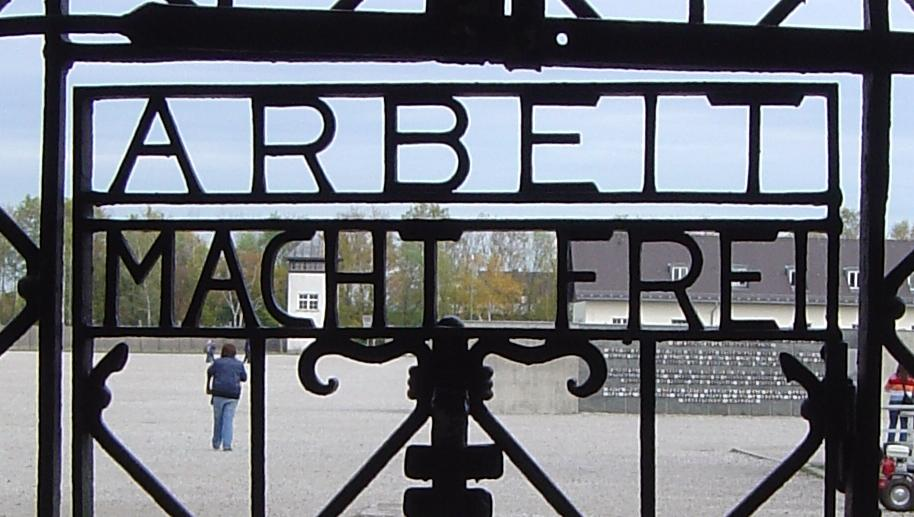
Gate in the Dachau concentration camp memorial

All aspects of camp life—the admission and registration of the new prisoners, the forced labour, the prisoner housing, the roll calls—were accompanied by humiliation and harassment.

Admission, registration, and interrogation of the detainees were accompanied by scornful remarks from SS officials. The prisoners were stepped on and beaten during roll call. Forced labour partly consisted of pointless tasks and heavy labour, which aimed to wear down the prisoners.

Many of the concentration camps channeled forced labour to benefit the German war machine. In these cases the SS saw excessive working hours as a means of maximizing output. Oswald Pohl, the leader of the SS-Wirtschafts-Verwaltungshauptamt ("SS Economy and Administration Main Bureau", or SS-WVHA), who oversaw the employment of forced labour at the concentration camps, ordered on April 30, 1942:

The camp commander alone is responsible for the use of man power. This work must be exhausting in the true sense of the word in order to achieve maximum performance. [...] There are no limits to working hours. [...] Time consuming walks and mid-day breaks only for the purpose of eating are prohibited. [...] He [the camp commander] must connect clear technical knowledge in military and economic matters with sound and wise leadership of groups of people, which he should bring together to achieve a high performance potential.

Up to 25,000 of the 35,000 prisoners appointed to work for IG Farben in Auschwitz died. The average life expectancy of a slave laborer on a work assignment amounted to less than four months. The emaciated forced-labourers died from exhaustion or disease or they were deemed to be incapable of work and murdered. About 30 percent of the forced labourers who were assigned to dig tunnels, which were constructed for weapon factories in the last months of the war, died. In satellite camps, which were established near mines and industrial firms, death rates were even higher as accommodations and supplies were often worse than in the main camps.

== In the Soviet Union ==
The Soviet Gulag is sometimes presented as a system of death camps, particularly in post-Communist Eastern European politics. This controversial position has been criticized, considering that with the exception of the war years, a very large majority of people who entered the Gulag left alive. Alexander Solzhenitsyn introduced the expression camps of extermination by labour in his non-fiction work The Gulag Archipelago. According to him, the system eradicated opponents by forcing them to work as prisoners on big state-run projects (for example the White Sea–Baltic Canal, quarries, remote railroads and urban development projects) under inhumane conditions. Political writer Roy Medvedev wrote: "The penal system in the Kolyma and in the camps in the north was deliberately designed for the extermination of people." Soviet historian Alexander Nikolaevich Yakovlev expands upon this, stating that Stalin was the "architect of the gulag system for totally destroying human life".

Political theorist Hannah Arendt argued that although the Soviet government deemed them all "forced labor" camps, this in fact highlighted that the work in some of the camps was deliberately pointless, since "forced labor is the normal condition of all Russian workers, who have no freedom of movement and can be arbitrarily drafted for work at any place and at any time." She differentiated between "authentic" forced-labor camps, concentration camps, and "annihilation camps". In authentic labor camps, inmates worked in "relative freedom and are sentenced for limited periods." Concentration camps had extremely high mortality rates but were still "essentially organized for labor purposes." Annihilation camps were those where the inmates were "systematically wiped out through starvation and neglect." She criticizes other commentators' conclusion that the purpose of the camps was a supply of cheap labor. According to her, the Soviets were able to liquidate the camp system without serious economic consequences, showing that the camps were not an important source of labor and were overall economically irrelevant.

== See also ==
- Arbeit macht frei
- Gulag
- Death march
- Hunger Plan, a German plan to starve the Slavic and Jewish populations
- Jägerstab
- Labour battalions (Turkey)
- Penal labour
- Utilitarian genocide
- Reform through labor
