= Colonialism and genocide =

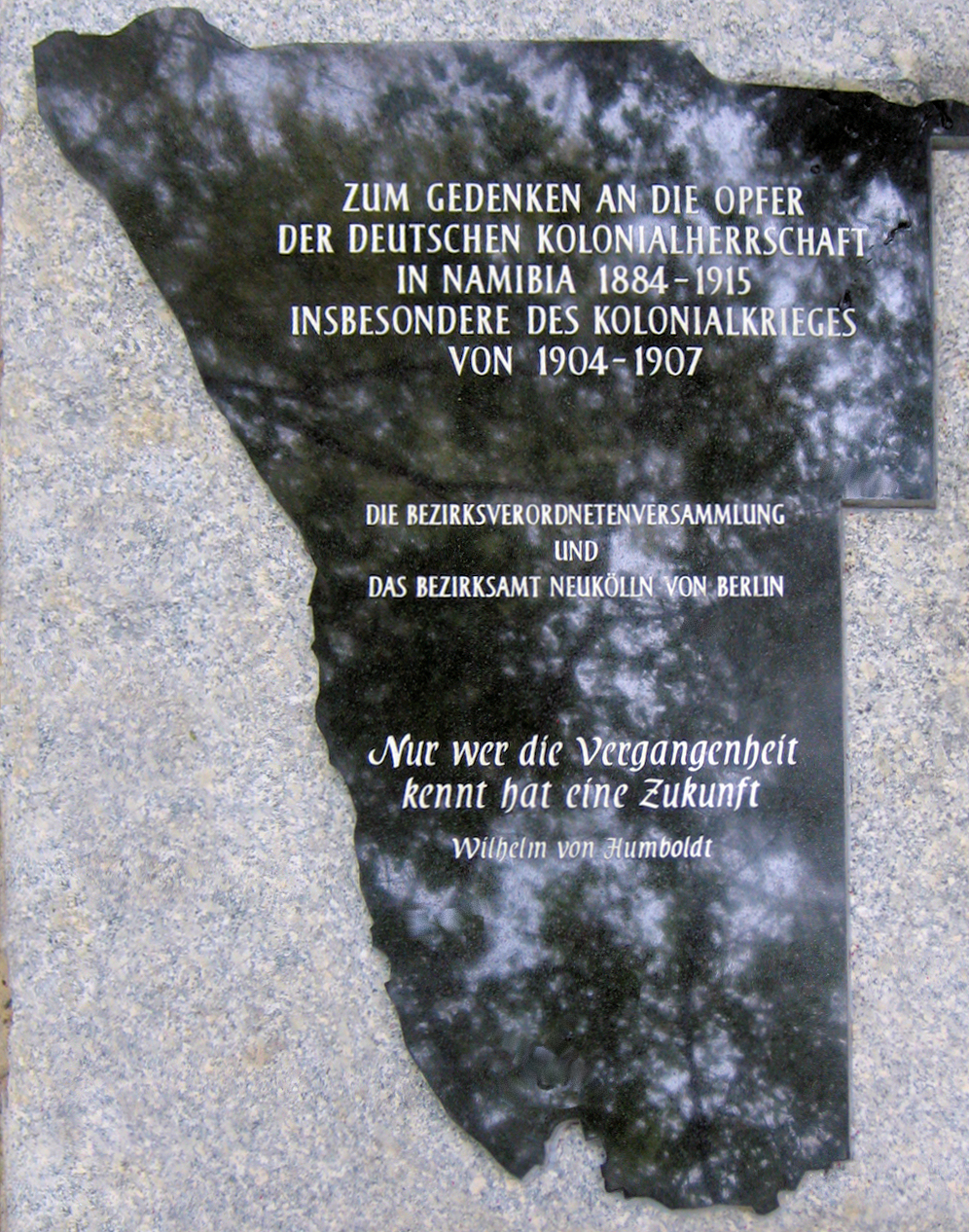
Memorial in Berlin-Neukölln to the victims of the Herero and Nama genocide perpetrated by the German Empire against the Herero and Nama peoples of German South West Africa (present-day Namibia)

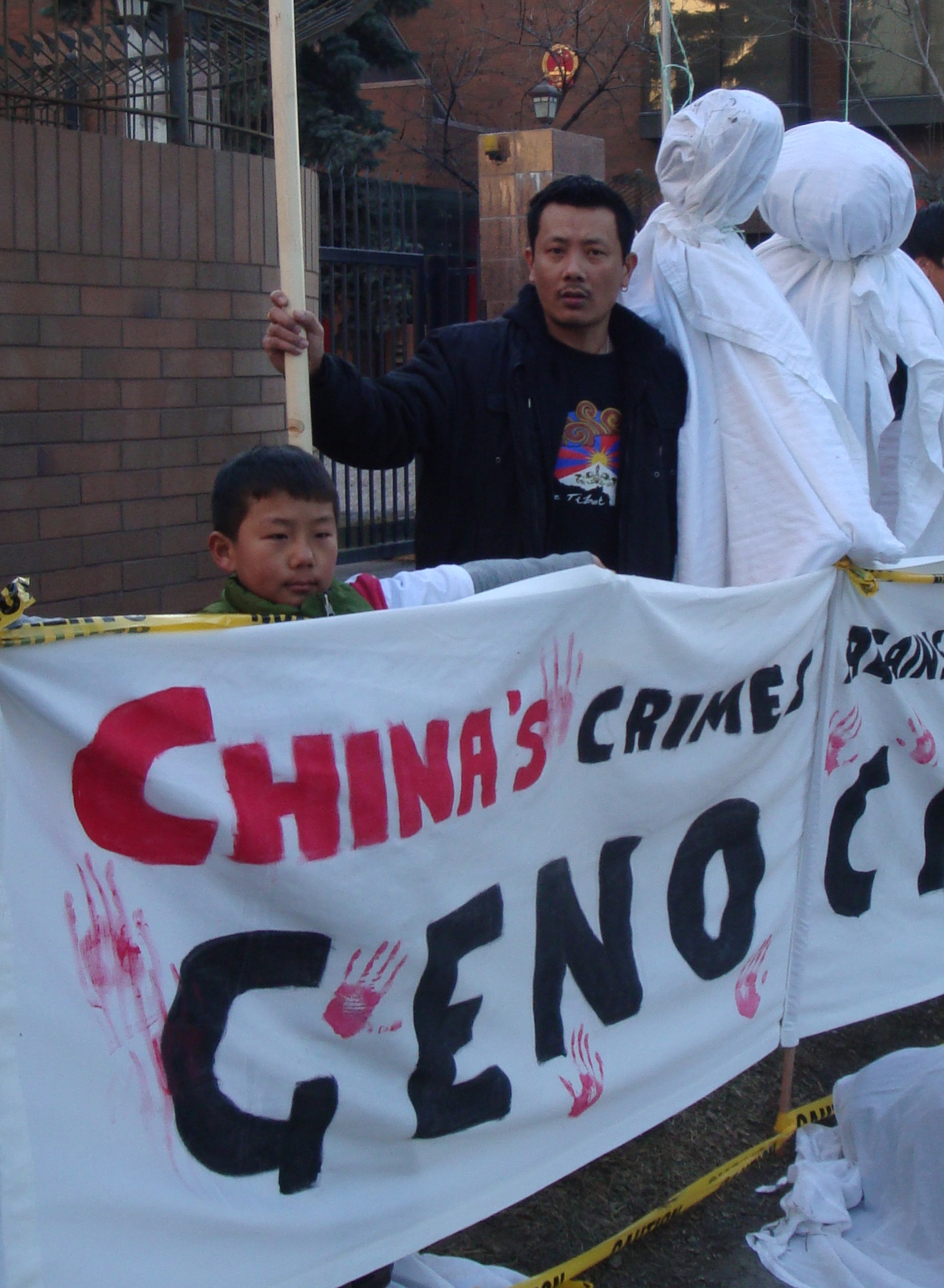
Tibetan people in protest against their treatment by China

Colonialism's emphasis on imperialism, land dispossession, resource extraction, forced conversion, and cultural destruction frequently resulted in genocidal practices aimed at attacking Indigenous peoples and existing populations as a means to attain colonial goals. According to historian Patrick Wolfe, "[t]he question of genocide is never far from discussions of settler colonialism." Historians have commented that although colonialism does not necessarily directly involve genocide, research suggests that the two share a connection.

States have practised colonialism during various periods in history, even during progressive eras such as the Enlightenment. During the Enlightenment, a period in the history of 17th- and 18th-century Europe which was marked by some progressive reforms, natural social hierarchies were reinforced. Europeans who were educated, white, and native-born were considered high-class, whereas less-educated, non-European people were considered low-class. These "natural" hierarchies were reinforced by progressives such as the Marquis de Condorcet (1743-1794), a French mathematician, who believed that slaves were savages due to their lack of modern practices, despite the fact that he advocated the abolition of slavery. The colonization process usually starts by attacking the homes of its targets. Typically, the people who are subjected to colonizing practices are portrayed as lacking modernity, because they and the colonialists do not have the same level of education or technology.

Raphael Lemkin first coined the term "genocide" in the light of the Armenian genocide of 1915-1917 and the Nazi Holocaust in the 1940s, although genocides have been committed since ancient times. The United Nations adopted the term and declared genocide an internationally illegal practice as a part of Resolution 96 in 1946. Various definitions of genocide exist. The 1948 Convention of Genocide defined genocide as "acts committed with intent to destroy, in whole or in part, a national, ethnical, racial or religious group". All definitions of genocide involve ethnicity, race, or religion as a motivational factor. Genocide scholar Israel Charny has proposed a definition of genocide in the course of colonization.

The history of Tasmania provides an example where settlers originating from Europe wiped out Aboriginal Tasmanians, an event which is genocide by definition as well as an event which resulted from settler colonialism. Additionally, instances of colonialism and genocide in California and in Hispaniola are cited below. The instance of California references the colonization and genocide of indigenous tribes by European Americans (prospectors and settlers) during the gold rush period of the 19th century. The example in Hispaniola discusses the island's colonization by Columbus and other Spanish conquistadors and the genocide inflicted on the native Taíno people.

== Researched examples of genocide linked to colonialism ==
- Another example of colonialism and genocide is the genocide which was committed against the Taíno people on Hispaniola after the arrival of Christopher Columbus and other Spanish colonizers in December 1492. Initially leaving 39 Spaniards behind, Columbus left, and a year later, he returned with more Spaniards in order to complete his conquest of the Dominican Republic. There are no exact tallies of how many Taíno people inhabited Hispaniola when Columbus arrived on it. However, it is estimated that the number of Taíno people who lived on Hispaniola was at least hundreds of thousands and it may have been up to a million or more. However, during the 25 years when the Spanish colonized the islands of Hispaniola, the Taino people were murdered, subjected to slavery, and by the year 1514, only 32,000 Taíno people remained alive.
- The Black War of Tasmania (1820s–1832) was a guerrilla war fought between British settlers and Aboriginal Tasmanians, which resulted in the deaths of nearly 900 Aboriginal locals and the near extinction of the island's Aboriginal population.
- According to Jack Norton, a Hupa and Cherokee scholar, the colonization of California was attributed to Manifest Destiny, and the success of European colonizers in the West was attributed to the genocide of indigenous peoples. In a government-sponsored move to California, European colonizers emigrated west to further colonize the north American continent due to the discovery of gold in California. Upon arriving, Brendan Lindsay, an American behavioral scientist, notes that the euro-American group encountered nearly 150,000 indigenous tribes, and colonizers worked to drive them away, murder them, or have them collected by militiamen or vigilante forces. As the gold rush ended and as euro-American colonizers began to cultivate the land and create democracy in California, the treatment of indigenous tribes became much worse. The first California Governor, Peter H. Burnett, declared that a "war of extermination" should be waged against Indians, the war was recounted by numerous newspapers which were published at that time.
- According to the Tibetan Government in Exile (TGIE), during the early years of the rule of the Chinese administration in Tibet, an estimated 1.2 million Tibetans died between 1951 and 1984. Tibet expert Barry Sautman considers this number highly "inaccurate," because there is "no credible evidence of ongoing mass killing, physically enforced birth control, or forced intermarriage in Tibet." Sautman also challenges the notion that Chinese practices in Tibet can be considered genocidal or colonial, stating that "Tibet's non-colonial nature can be derived from the nature of modern colonialism" and citing the political and legal equality of Tibetans under the current administration.
- In Belgium, the atrocities in the Congo Free State are not in the public discourse, and the topic is not entirely addressed in education. The archive of the colony was destroyed. In 1999, Adam Hochschild published King Leopold's Ghost, an award-winning book (and a documentary) about the atrocities committed in the Congo Free State. The American Historical Association has awarded the book and claimed that Belgium has come to terms with this history because of the book.

== Settler colonialism and genocide ==
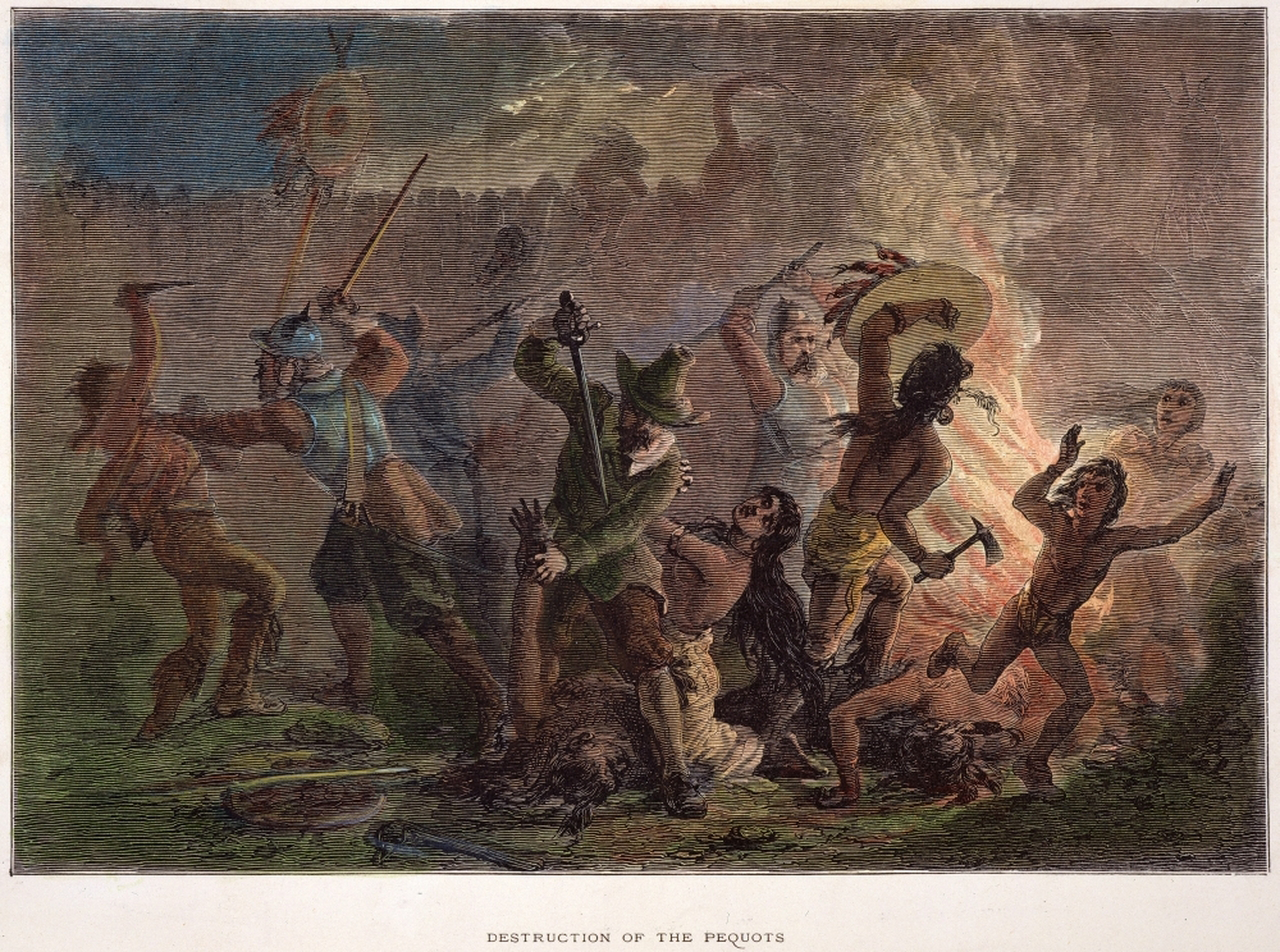
Mystic Massacre 1637

There is a number of international scholars whose work established a relation between settler colonialism and genocide, as seen below. Settler colonialism is different from immigration because immigrants often assimilate into an existing society, not to destroy it to replace it.

Ann Curthoys is an Australian historian and academic who wrote about the view of genocide scholar Leo Kuper: "Nevertheless, the course of colonization of North and South America, the West Indies, and Australia and Tasmania, [Leo] Kuper observes, has certainly been marked all too often by genocide." Noam Chomsky has considered settler colonialism to be the most vicious form of imperialism, and describes the lack of self-awareness of the genocide by some Americans.

Pulitzer Prize winning historian Bernard Baylin has said that the Dutch and English conquests were just as brutal as those of the Spanish and Portuguese, in certain places and in certain times "genocidal". He says that this history, for example the Pequot War, is not erased but conveniently forgotten. The different European colonizing powers were all similarly cruel in their dealings with Indigenous peoples.

David Stannard historian and professor of American Studies at the University of Hawaii analyzed the genocidal process in two cases of colonization. He said that the British did not need massive labor as the Spanish, but land: "And therein lies the central difference between the genocide committed by the Spanish and that of the Anglo-Americans: in British America extermination was the primary goal." Thus, in British America they would clear the land of Indigenous peoples, and put the few survivors in reserves.

Gregory D. Smithers, a lecturer in the Department of History at the University of Aberdeen, has weighed in as well: "Ward Churchill refers to settler colonialism in North America as 'the American holocaust', and David Stannard similarly portrayed the European colonization of the Americas as an example of 'human incineration and carnage'."

Mark Levene, a historian at University of Southampton, linked colonialism and genocide: "In this, of course, we come back to the fatal nexus between the Anglo-American drive to rapid state-building and genocide." Levene has said that the authorities are silent about genocide in the case of the colonization of Australia, even though the press reports described the events.

Roxanne Dunbar-Ortiz, an American historian, professor at California State University, describes settler colonialism as inherently genocidal from the perspective of the terms of the Genocide Convention. She pointed out that genocide does not have to be total to be genocide, as the most famous genocide (the Holocaust) of all was not total.

Stephen Howe, professor in the History and Cultures of Colonialism at the University of Bristol, UK, relates colonialism with genocide and says the case for colonialism causing genocide is very strong.

Martin Shaw has argued that in a colonial context: "each side shattered the opposing civilian population while pursuing military goals."

Historian Jacques Depelchin has said that the crimes of colonization have always been denied.

Christian P. Sherrer has argued that almost all European colonial powers used genocide as part of the colonization process. According to Elyse Semerdjian, settler colonial warfare is a slow genocidal process.

== See also ==
- Denial of atrocities against indigenous peoples
- Generalplan Ost
- Genocide of indigenous peoples
- Indigenous response to colonialism
- Kalinago genocide
- Libyan genocide (1929–1934)
- Namibian genocide and the Holocaust
- Taíno genocide
- Gaza genocide
