= Bibliography of the Greek genocide =

List of books and journal articles about the Greek genocide

- Part of World War I, the Aftermath of World War I, and the Armenian genocide
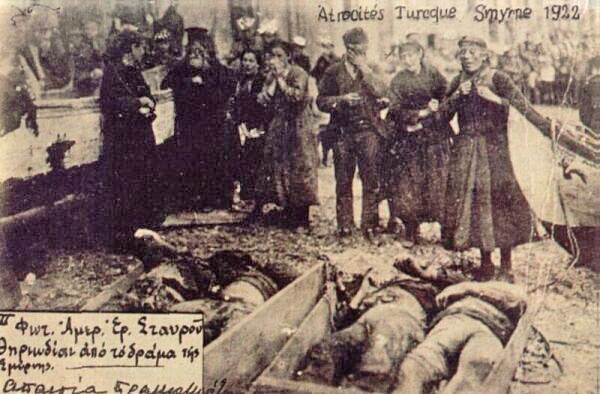
- Greek civilians mourn their dead relatives, Great Fire of Smyrna, 1922
- Location: Ottoman Empire
- Date: 1913–1923
- Target: Ottoman Greeks
- Attack type: Deportation, mass murder, death march
- Deaths: 300,000–900,000
- Perpetrators: Ottoman Empire, Turkish National Movement
- Motive: Anti-Greek sentiment, Turkification, Persecution of Eastern Orthodox Christians

Greek genocide

Background
- Young Turk Revolution, Ottoman Greeks, Pontic Greeks, Ottoman Empire

The genocide
- Labour battalions, Death march, Pontic Greek genocide, Phocaea massacre, Evacuation of Ayvalik, İzmit massacres, 1914 Greek deportations, Samsun deportations, Amasya trials, Burning of Smyrna

Resistance and rescue
- Greek resistance during the Greek genocide, Seventh Battle of Dazli, Anton Pasha, Efkleidis Kourtidis, Habil Bey

Foreign aid and relief
- Relief Committee for Greeks of Asia Minor, American Committee for Relief in the Near East, Asa Jennings, Esther Pohl Lovejoy, Pope Benedict XV, Pope Pius XI, Tokei Maru

Responsible parties
- Young Turks or Committee of Union and Progress; Three Pashas: Talat, Enver, Djemal; Bahaeddin Şakir, Teskilati Mahsusa or Special Organization, Nureddin Pasha, Topal Osman, Mustafa Kemal Atatürk

See also
- Greco-Turkish War (1919–1922), Greeks in Turkey, Population Exchange, Greek refugees, Armenian genocide, Assyrian genocide, Diyarbekir genocide, Istanbul trials of 1919–1920, Malta Tribunals

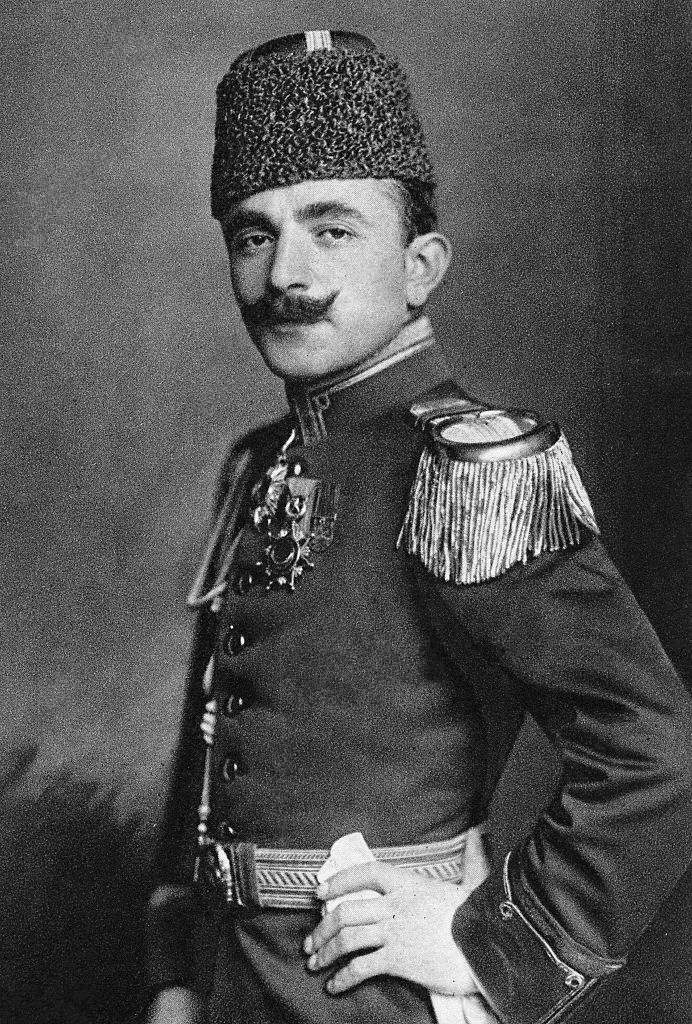
Enver Pasha, Turkish leader during the Ottoman genocides

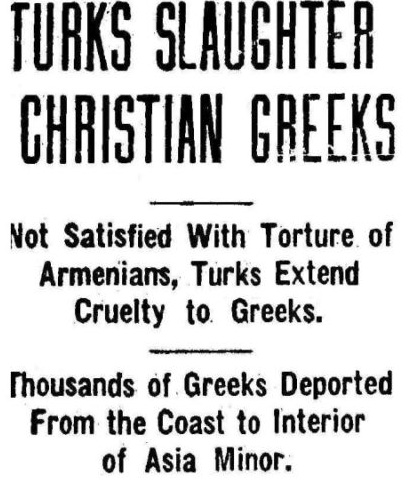
"Turks Slaughter Christian Greeks", Lincoln Daily Star, 19 October 1917

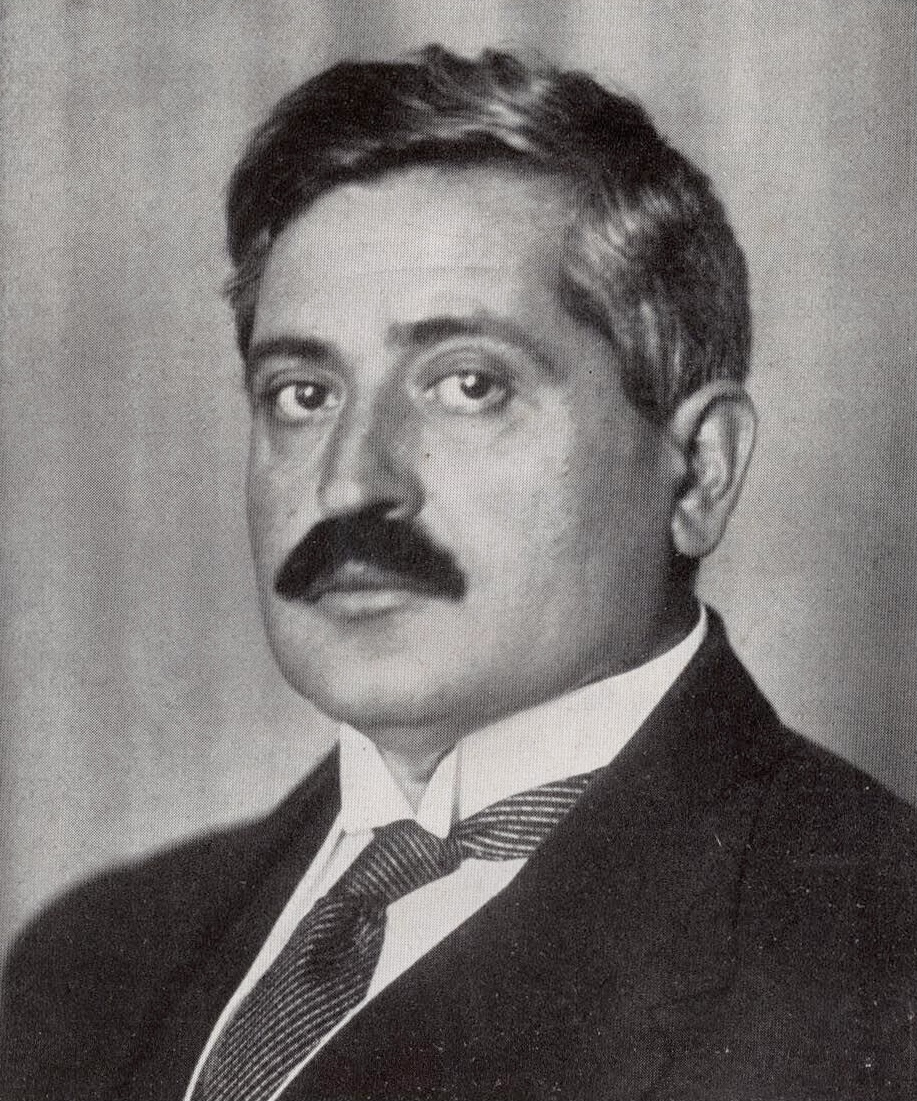
Talaat Pasha, Turkish leader during the Ottoman genocides.

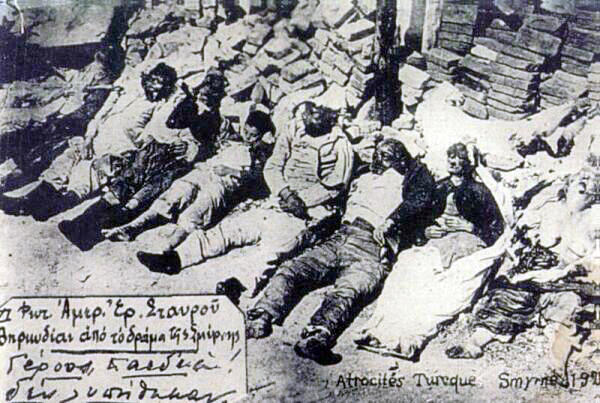
Photo whose text indicates it was taken by representatives of the Red Cross in Smyrna after the fire. Translation: "Elderly and children were not spared".

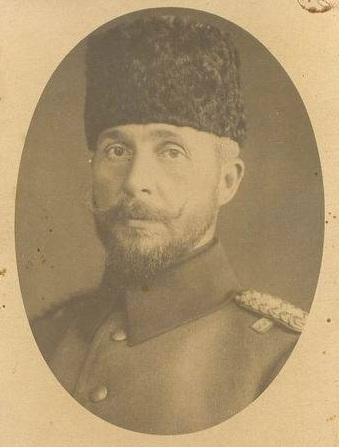
Nureddin Pasha, Turkish leader during the Ottoman genocides

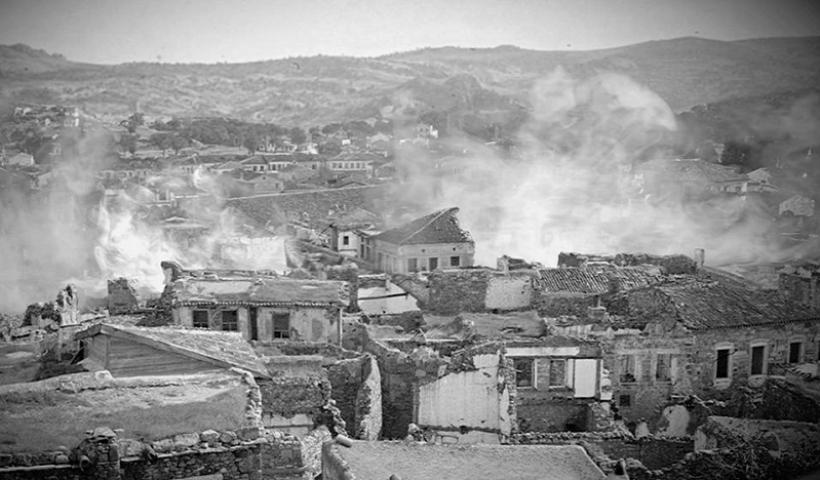
Phocaea in flames, during the Massacre of Phocaea

Mustafa Kemal Atatürk, Turkish leader during the Ottoman genocides.

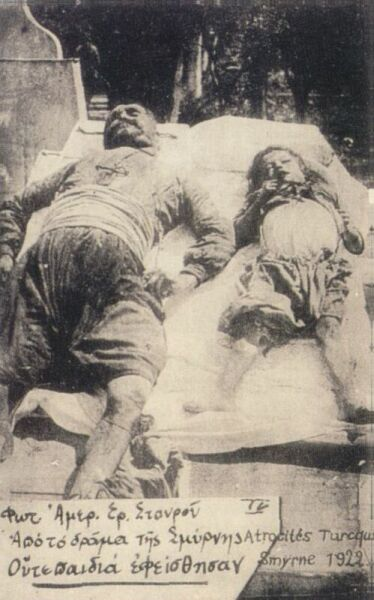
Smyrna, 1922. Translation: "No children were allowed to live".

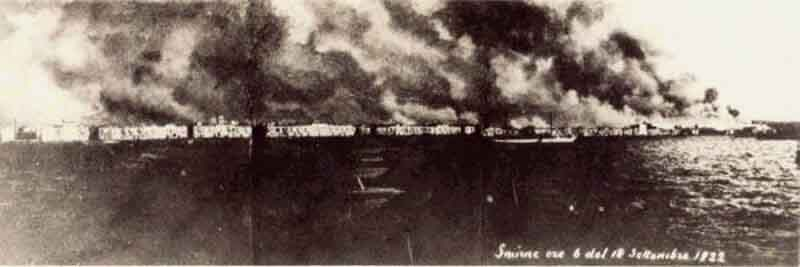
The Burning of Smyrna

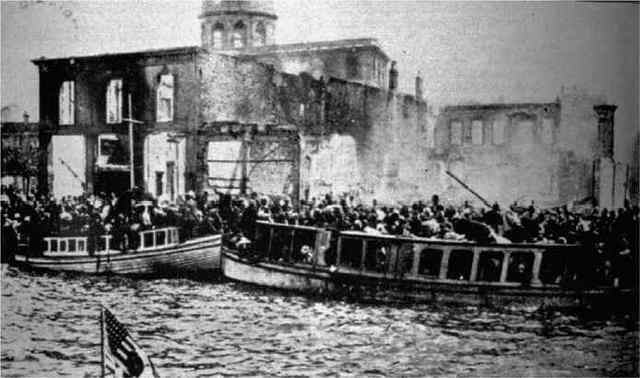
People fleeing the 1922 Smyrna fire try to reach Allied ships, in a photo taken from the launch boat of a US battleship.

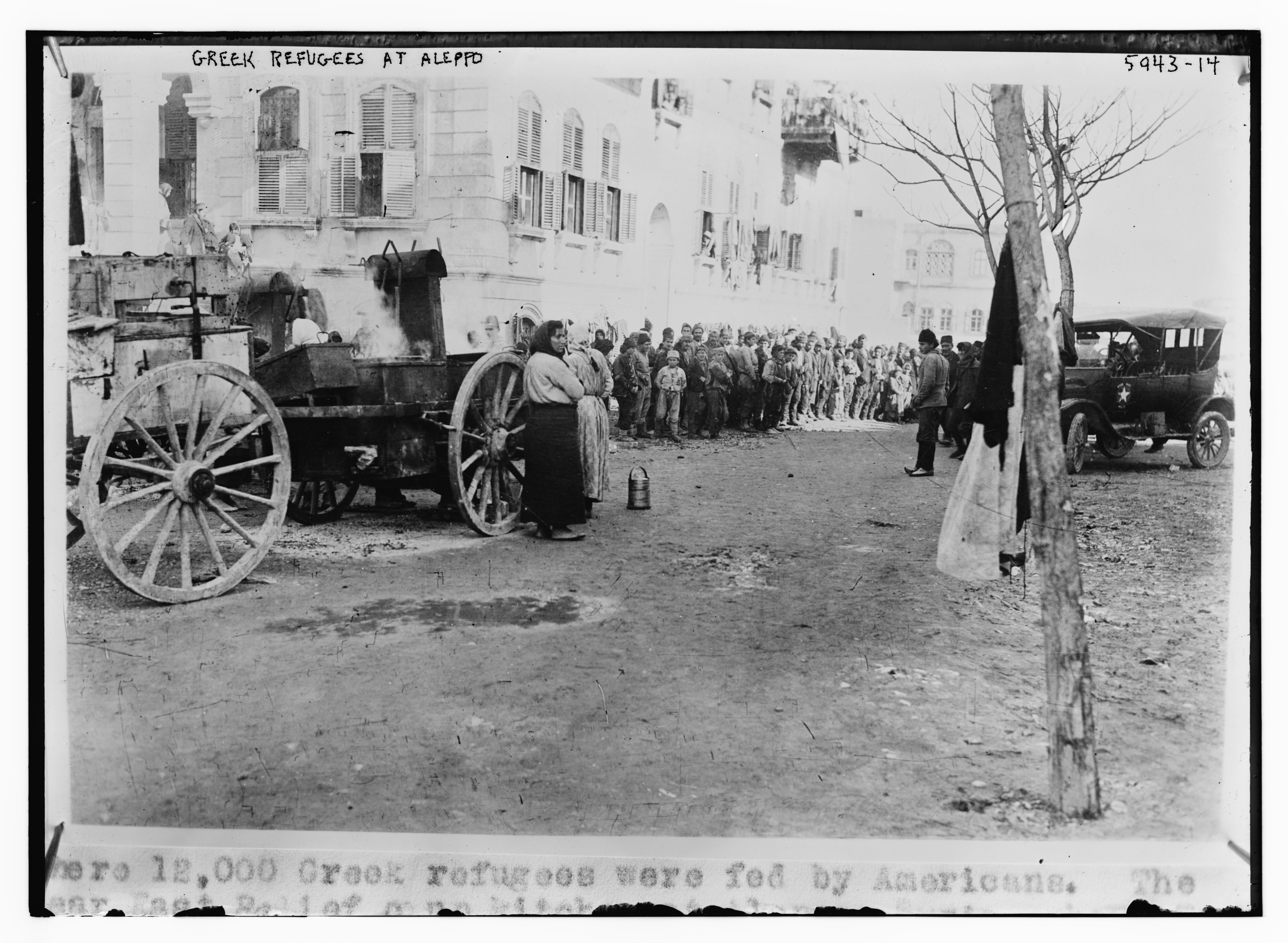
Greek refugees at Aleppo

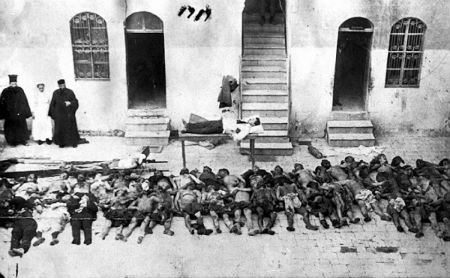
Pontic genocide victims

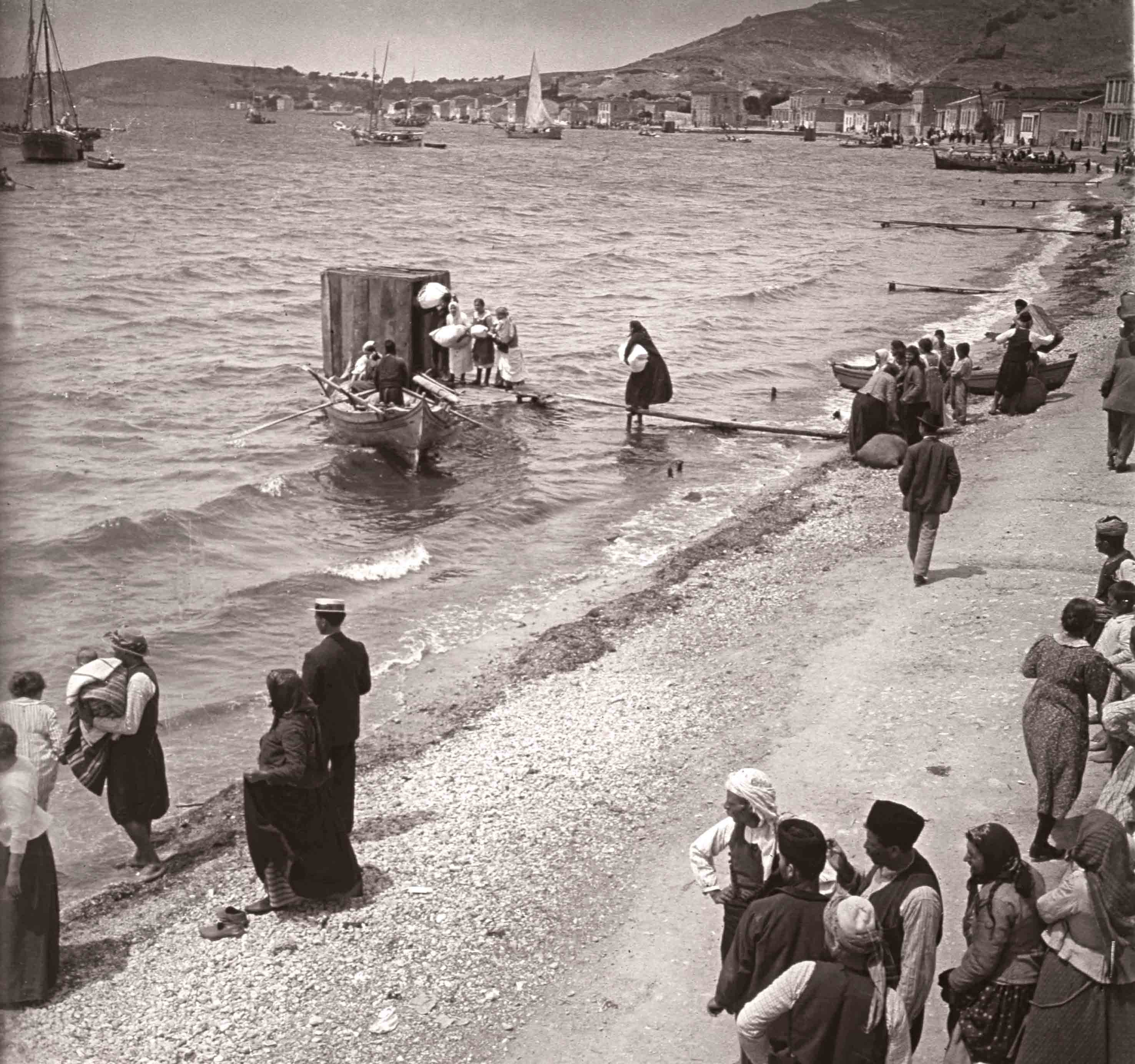
Ottoman Greek women forced to leave Foça, 13 June 1914

This is a select bibliography of academic level English language books (including translations) and journal articles about the history of Greek genocide, published mainly after World War II, (Note: Works published during or before World War II should be limited to areas where there is no significant post World War II books on the subject or when the work in question has significant historical merit. An obvious exception to this would be the section on contemporary and primary sources, which would plainly be before World War II.) Many works below contain information about the Greek genocide in the context of the Armenian genocide.

The Greek Genocide was the mass killings and deportations of Greeks in the Ottoman Empire by Turkish forces. It resulted in the deaths of hundreds of thousands of Greeks, including the extermination of Pontian and Anatolian Greeks, the destruction of Smyrna, and widespread ethnic cleansing in Greek areas of Asia Minor.

The Greek and Armenian Genocides are considered part of the more extensive period of mass killings and ethnic cleansing of Christian populations in the Ottoman Empire at the beginning of the 20th century. Both genocides were carried out by the Ottoman government and Turkish nationalist forces and involved mass killings, forced deportations, and population transfers. The events have been recognized as a genocide by numerous countries but have not been officially recognized by the Turkish government.

Works listed here are cited in the notes or bibliographies of scholarly sources. Each is published by an academic or major press, written by a recognized expert, or substantially reviewed in scholarly journals; borderline cases are omitted. A selection of primary sources are included. Many of the books below carry their own bibliographies; see the Further reading section for other bibliographies, and the External links section for historical sites, academic sites, and museums.

Citations follow APA style. (Note: Entries are in plain text APA 7 format without templates; templates are used only for reviews and notes.) Book have citations to academic journal or mainstream published reviews when available. For books only partly about the subject, relevant chapter or section titles are provided when useful and available. Translators of the original-language edition are included when possible. In cases where a title or name has appeared with more than one English spelling, the most recent published form is used and a footnote documents any earlier title under which the work appeared.

== Books ==
Some works below contain annotations to academic journal reviews.

- Ahmad, F. (2014). The Young Turks and the Ottoman Nationalities: Armenians, Greeks, Albanians, Jews, and Arabs, 1908–1918. University of Utah Press.
- Akçam, T. (2015). The Young Turks' Crime against Humanity: The Armenian Genocide and Ethnic Cleansing in the Ottoman Empire. Princeton: Princeton University Press.
- Akçam, T., Kyriakidis, T., & Chatzikyriakidis, K. (Eds.). (2023). The Genocide of the Christian Populations in the Ottoman Empire and its Aftermath (1st edition). Routledge.
- Butt, A. I. (2017). The Ottoman Empire's Escalation from Reforms to the Armenian Genocide, 1908–1915. In Secession and Security: Explaining State Strategy against Separatists (pp. 125–162). Cornell University Press.
- Buttar, P. (2017). The Splintered Empires: The Eastern Front 1917–21. Osprey Publishing.
- Clark, B. (2006). Twice a stranger: The mass expulsions that forged modern Greece and Turkey. Harvard University Press.
- de Zayas, A. (2012). The Ottoman genocide of the Greeks and other Christian minorities in light of the Genocide Convention. In T. Hofmann, M. Bjørnlund, & V. Meichanetsidis (Eds.), The genocide of the Ottoman Greeks: Studies on the state-sponsored campaign of extermination of the Christians of Asia Minor (1912–1922) and its aftermath: History, law, memory. Aristide D. Caratzas.
- Dobkin, M. H. (1998). Smyrna 1922: The Destruction of a City. New York, NY: Newmark Press.
- Doumanis, N. (2013). Before the nation: Muslim–Christian coexistence and its destruction in late-Ottoman Anatolia. Oxford University Press.
- Erol, E. (2016). The Ottoman crisis in Western Anatolia: Turkey's Belle Époque and the transition to a modern nation state. I.B. Tauris.
- Fotiadis, C. (Ed.). (2004). The Genocide of the Pontus Greeks. Herodotus.
- Fromkin, D. (2009). A Peace to End All Peace: The Fall of the Ottoman Empire and the Creation of the Modern Middle East (20th Anniversary edition). Holt.
- Gaunt, D. (2006). Massacres, Resistance, Protectors: Muslim-Christian Relations in Eastern Anatolia during World War I. Gorgias Press.
- Gingeras, R. (2009). Sorrowful shores: Violence, ethnicity, and the end of the Ottoman Empire, 1912–1923. Oxford University Press.
- Gingeras, R. (2016). Fall of the Sultanate: The Great War and the End of the Ottoman Empire 1908–1922 (Illustrated edition). Oxford University Press.
- Halo, T. (2017). The genocide of the Ottoman Greeks, 1913–23: Myths and facts. In G. N. Shirinian (Ed.), Genocide in the Ottoman Empire: Armenians, Assyrians, and Greeks, 1913–1923 (1st ed., pp. 300–322). Berghahn Books.
- Hinton, A. L., La Pointe, T., & Irvin-Erickson, D. (2013). Hidden Genocides: Power, Knowledge, Memory. Rutgers University Press.
- Hirschon, R. (1998). Heirs of the Greek catastrophe: The social life of Asia Minor refugees in Piraeus (2nd ed.). Berghahn Books.
- Hirschon, R. (Ed.). (2003). Crossing the Aegean: An appraisal of the 1923 compulsory population exchange between Greece and Turkey. Berghahn Books.
- Hofmann, T., Bjørnlund, M., & Meichanetsidis, V. (Eds.). (2012). The Genocide of the Ottoman Greeks. Aristide D. Caratzas.
- Iğsız, A. (2018). Humanism in ruins: Entangled legacies of the Greek–Turkish population exchange. Stanford University Press.
- Ihrig, S. (2014). Atatürk in the Nazi Imagination. Belknap Press.
- Jones, A. (2023). The Ottoman destruction of Christian minorities. In Genocide: A comprehensive introduction (4th ed.). Routledge.
- Kieser, H. L. (2018). Talaat Pasha: Father of Modern Turkey, Architect of Genocide (Illustrated edition). Princeton University Press.
- Kieser, H. L., Anderson, M. L., Bayraktar, S., & Schmutz, T. (Eds.). (2019). The End of the Ottomans: The Genocide of 1915 and the Politics of Turkish Nationalism. I.B. Tauris.
- Kontogeorge-Kostos, S. (2010). Before the Silence: Archival News Reports of the Christian Holocaust that Begs to be Remembered. Gorgias Press.
- Kontogiorgi, E. (2006). Population exchange in Greek Macedonia: The rural settlement of refugees 1922–1930. Oxford University Press. (Note: Alternative title: The Rural Settlement of Refugees 1922-1930.)
- Lewis, B. (1961). The Making of Modern Turkey. London: Oxford University Press.
- Llewellyn Smith, M. (1973). Ionian Vision: Greece in Asia Minor, 1919–1922. London: Allen Lane.
- Mann, M. (2005). The dark side of democracy: Explaining ethnic cleansing. Cambridge University Press.
- Matossian, B. D. (2022). The Horrors of Adana: Revolution and Violence in the Early Twentieth Century. Stanford University Press.
- Midlarsky, M. I. (2005). The Killing Trap. Cambridge: Cambridge University Press.
- Milton, G. (2009). Paradise Lost: Smyrna 1922. The Destruction of Islam's City of Tolerance. Sceptre.
- Morack, E. (2017). The dowry of the state? The politics of abandoned property and the population exchange in Turkey, 1921–1945. University of Bamberg Press.
- Morris, B., & Ze'evi, D. (2019). The Thirty-Year Genocide: Turkey's Destruction of Its Christian Minorities, 1894–1924. Harvard University Press.
- Özsu, U. (2015). Formalizing displacement: International law and population transfers. Oxford University Press.
- Payk, M. M., & Pergher, R. (Eds.). (2019). Beyond Versailles: Sovereignty, Legitimacy, and the Formation of New Polities after the Great War. Indiana University Press.
- Pentzopoulos, D. (2002). The Balkan exchange of minorities and its impact upon Greece. Hurst.
- Psomiades, H. J. (1968). The Eastern question: The last phase — A study in Greek–Turkish diplomacy. Institute for Balkan Studies.
- Rogan, E. (2015). The Fall of the Ottomans: The Great War in the Middle East. Basic Books.
- Rummel, R. J. (1997). Death by Government. Transaction Publishers.
- Sartiaux, F. (2008). Phocaea 1913–1920. The account of Félix Sartiaux. Rizario Idrima.
- Schaller, D. J., & Zimmerer, J. (Eds.). (2009). Late Ottoman Genocides: The dissolution of the Ottoman Empire and Young Turkish population and extermination policies (1st edition). Routledge.
- Shaw, S. J., & Shaw, E. K. (1977). History of the Ottoman Empire and Modern Turkey. Cambridge: Cambridge University Press.
- Shenk, R. (Ed.). (2012). America's Black Sea Fleet. Naval Institute Press.
- Shirinian, G. N. (Ed.). (2012). The Asia Minor Catastrophe and the Ottoman Greek Genocide. Asia Minor and Pontos Hellenic Research Center.
- Shirinian, G. N. (Ed.). (2017). Genocide in the Ottoman Empire: Armenians, Assyrians, and Greeks, 1913–1923. Berghahn Books.
- Shirinian, G. N. (Ed.). (2019). The Greek Genocide 1913–1923: New Perspectives. The Asia Minor and Pontos Hellenic Research Center.
- Sjöberg, E. (2016). The Making of the Greek Genocide: Contested Memories of the Ottoman Greek Catastrophe. Berghahn Books.
- Solomonidis, V. (2010). Greece in Asia Minor, 1919–1922. C. Hurst and Co. Publishers.
- Stavridis, S. T. (2008). The Greek–Turkish War 1919–23: An Australian press perspective. Gorgias Press.
- Suny, R. G., Göçek, F. M., & Naimark, N. M. (Eds.). (2011). A Question of Genocide: Armenians and Turks at the End of the Ottoman Empire. Oxford University Press.
- Travis, H. (2014). Constructing the "Armenian genocide": How scholars unremembered the Assyrian and Greek genocides in the Ottoman Empire. In A. L. Hinton, T. La Pointe, & D. Irvin-Erickson (Eds.), Hidden genocides: Power, knowledge, memory (pp. 170–192). Rutgers University Press.
- Travis, H. (2010). Genocide in the Middle East: The Ottoman Empire, Iraq and Sudan. Carolina Academic Press.
- Tsirkinidis, H. (1999). At Last We Uprooted Them: The Genocide of Greeks of Pontos, Thrace, and Asia Minor, through the French Archives. Thessaloniki: Kyriakidis Bros.
- Tsoukalas, C. (1969). The Greek Tragedy. New York: Penguin.
- Tusan, M. (2012). Smyrna's Ashes: Humanitarianism, Genocide and the Birth of the Middle East. University of California Press.
- Üngör, U. Ü. (2012). The Making of Modern Turkey: Nation and State in Eastern Anatolia, 1913–1950. Oxford University Press.
- Ureneck, L. (2015). The Great Fire: One American's mission to rescue victims of the Twentieth century's first Genocide. Ecco.
- Vardanyan, G. (2017). The Greek genocide in the Ottoman Empire: Parallels with the Armenian genocide. In G. N. Shirinian (Ed.), Genocide in the Ottoman Empire: Armenians, Assyrians, and Greeks, 1913–1923 (1st ed., pp. 274–299). Berghahn Books.
- Watenpaugh, K. D. (2015). Bread from stones: The Middle East and the making of modern humanitarianism. University of California Press.
- Yeghiayan, V. (2007). British reports on Ethnic Cleansing in Anatolia 1919–1922: The Armenian-Greek Section. Center for Armenian Remembrance.
- Yıldırım, O. (2006). Diplomacy and displacement: Reconsidering the Turco-Greek exchange of populations, 1922–1934. Routledge.
- Zürcher, E. J. (2010). The Young Turk Legacy and Nation Building: From the Ottoman Empire to Atatürk's Turkey. I.B.Tauris.

== Journal articles ==
- Aktar, A. (2007). Debating the Armenian Massacres in the Last Ottoman Parliament, November – December 1918. History Workshop Journal, 64, 240–270.
- Arango, T. (2015, April 16). A Century After Armenian Genocide, Turkey's Denial Only Deepens. The New York Times.
- Bjørnlund, M. (2008). The 1914 cleansing of Aegean Greeks as a case of violent Turkification. Journal of Genocide Research, 10(1), 41–58.
- Dadrian, V. N. (1994). The Documentation of the World War I Armenian Massacres in the Proceedings of the Turkish Military Tribunal. Journal of Political & Military Sociology, 22(1), 97–131.
- Dölek-Sever, D. (2017). Policing the "suspects": Ottoman Greeks and Armenians in Istanbul, 1914–18. Middle Eastern Studies, 53(4), 533–550.
- Georgelin, H. (2008). Perception of the other's fate: What Greek Orthodox refugees from the Ottoman Empire reported about the destruction of Ottoman Armenians. Journal of Genocide Research, 10(1), 59–76.
- Gerwarth, R., & Üngör, U. Ü. (2015). The Collapse of the Ottoman and Habsburg Empires and the Brutalisation of the Successor States. Journal of Modern European History, 13(2), 226–248.
- Giannuli, D. (1995). Greeks or "strangers at home": The experiences of Ottoman Greek refugees during their exodus to Greece, 1922–1923. Journal of Modern Greek Studies, 13(2), 271–287.
- Hofmann, T. (2015). The Genocide against the Ottoman Armenians: German Diplomatic Correspondence and Eyewitness Testimonies. Genocide Studies International, 9(1), 22–60.
- Kaloudis, G. (2014). Ethnic Cleansing In Asia Minor And The Treaty Of Lausanne. International Journal on World Peace, 31(1), 59–88.
- Kamouzis, D. (2017). Out of harm's way? Structural violence and the Greek Orthodox community of Istanbul during World War I. Journal of the Ottoman and Turkish Studies Association, 4(1), 189–211.
- Klapsis, A. (2014). Violent uprooting and forced migration: A demographic analysis of the Greek populations of Asia Minor, Pontus and Eastern Thrace. Middle Eastern Studies, 50(4), 622–639.
- Klapsis, A. (2024). The Greek population of Ottoman Pontus in the early twentieth century: A comparative demographic analysis. Middle Eastern Studies, 60(6), 948–960.
- Maksudyan, N. (2016). Agents or Pawns?: Nationalism and Ottoman Children during the Great War. Journal of the Ottoman and Turkish Studies Association, 3(1), 139–164.
- Meichanetsidis, V. Th. (2015). The Genocide of the Greeks of the Ottoman Empire, 1913–1923: A Comprehensive Overview. Genocide Studies International, 9(1), 104–173.
- Morack, E. (2015). Refugees, locals and "the" state: Property compensation in the province of Izmir following the Greco-Turkish population exchange of 1923. Journal of the Ottoman and Turkish Studies Association, 2(1), 147–166.
- Schaller, D. J., & Zimmerer, J. (2008). Late Ottoman genocides: The dissolution of the Ottoman Empire and Young Turkish population and extermination policies. Journal of Genocide Research, 10(1), 7–14.
- Şekeryan, A. (2017). Reactions of the Armenian Community to the Emergence of the Turkish National Movement (1919–20). Journal of the Ottoman and Turkish Studies Association, 4(2), 381–401.
- Shaw, S. J. (1998). Resettlement of Refugees in Anatolia, 1918–1923. Turkish Studies Association Bulletin, 22(1), 58–90.
- Smith, R. W. (2014). Genocide Denial and Prevention. Genocide Studies International, 8(1), 102–109.
- Smith, R. W. (2015). Introduction: The Ottoman Genocides of Armenians, Assyrians, and Greeks. Genocide Studies International, 9(1), 1–9.
- Travis, H. (2014). The United Nations and Genocide Prevention. Genocide Studies International, 8(2), 122–152.
- Üngör, U. Ü. (2012). Orphans, Converts, and Prostitutes: Social Consequences of War and Persecution in the Ottoman Empire, 1914–1923. War in History, 19(2), 173–192.
- Üngör, U. Ü. (2012). Rethinking the Violence of Pacification: State Formation and Bandits in Turkey, 1914–1937. Comparative Studies in Society and History, 54(4), 746–769.
- Üngör, U. Ü., & Lohr, E. (2014). Economic Nationalism, Confiscation, and Genocide: A Comparison of the Ottoman and Russian Empires during World War I. Journal of Modern European History, 12(4), 500–522.
- Yıldırım, O. (2022). Stephen Pericles Ladas and the 1923 Greco-Turkish exchange of populations: The making and unmaking of a narrative. Middle Eastern Studies, 58(4), 520–539.

== Genocide denial and distortion ==
Works about genocide denial and distortion, not works that deny or distort the history of the Greek genocide:

- Dixon, J. M. (2018). Dark pasts: Changing the state's story in Turkey and Japan. Cornell University Press.
- Göçek, F. M. (2015). Denial of violence: Ottoman past, Turkish present, and collective violence against the Armenians, 1789–2009. Oxford University Press.
- Jacobs, S. L. (2012). Genocide of others: Raphael Lemkin, the genocide of the Greeks, the Holocaust, and the present moment. In T. Hofmann, M. Bjørnlund, & V. Meichanetsidis (Eds.), The genocide of the Ottoman Greeks: Studies on the state-sponsored campaign of extermination of the Christians of Asia Minor (1912–1922) and its aftermath: History, law, memory. Aristide D. Caratzas.
- Kritikakos, T. (2026). The late Ottoman genocides: Historical context, academic debates, and legacy. In Armenian, Greek, and Assyrian genocide recognition in twenty-first century Australia (pp. 23–64). Palgrave Macmillan.
- Pranger, R. J. (2012). U.S. policy obstacles in recognizing the genocides of Christian minorities in the late Ottoman Empire. In G. N. Shirinian (Ed.), The Asia Minor catastrophe and the Ottoman Greek genocide: Essays on Asia Minor, Pontos, and Eastern Thrace, 1912–1923. Asia Minor and Pontos Hellenic Research Center.
- Sjöberg, E. (2019). Introduction: Cosmopolitan memory and the Greek genocide narrative. In The making of the Greek genocide: Contested memories of the Ottoman Greek catastrophe (pp. 1–16). Berghahn Books.
- Sjöberg, E. (2019). Nationalizing genocide: The recognition process in Greece. In The making of the Greek genocide: Contested memories of the Ottoman Greek catastrophe (pp. 73–117). Berghahn Books.
- Sjöberg, E. (2019). "Three genocides, one recognition": The "Christian Holocaust". In The making of the Greek genocide: Contested memories of the Ottoman Greek catastrophe (pp. 188–222). Berghahn Books.
- Smith, R. W. (2015). Introduction: The Ottoman Genocides of Armenians, Assyrians, and Greeks. Genocide Studies International, 9(1), 1–9.
- Wolfgram, M. A. (2023). Why does Turkish denialism of genocide against Christians persist? An examination of the political and cultural factors. In T. Akçam, T. Kyriakidis, & K. Chatzikyriakidis (Eds.), The genocide of the Christian populations in the Ottoman Empire and its aftermath (1908–1923) (pp. 153–170). Routledge.

== Background ==
- Çetinkaya, Y. D. (2014). Atrocity propaganda and the nationalization of the masses in the Ottoman Empire during the Balkan Wars (1912–13). International Journal of Middle East Studies, 46(4), 759–778.
- Gerwarth, R., & Üngör, U. Ü. (2015). The Collapse of the Ottoman and Habsburg Empires and the Brutalisation of the Successor States. Journal of Modern European History / Zeitschrift Für Moderne Europäische Geschichte / Revue d'histoire Européenne Contemporaine, 13(2), 226–248.
- Shirinian, G. N. (2017). The background to the late Ottoman genocides. In G. N. Shirinian (Ed.), Genocide in the Ottoman Empire: Armenians, Assyrians, and Greeks, 1913–1923 (1st ed., pp. 19–81). Berghahn Books.
- Sjöberg, E. (2019). Ottoman Twilight: The Background in Anatolia. In The Making of the Greek Genocide: Contested Memories of the Ottoman Greek Catastrophe (1st ed., Vol. 23, pp. 17–53). Berghahn Books.
- Soyalp, N. (2022). A history of collective traumas: The decline and the fall of the Ottoman Empire. In Historical traumas among Armenian, Kurdish, and Turkish people of Anatolia: A transdisciplinary perspective toward reconciliation (pp. 49–82). Liverpool University Press.
- Üngör, U. Ü. (2012). Orphans, Converts, and Prostitutes: Social Consequences of War and Persecution in the Ottoman Empire, 1914–1923. War in History, 19(2), 173–192.

== Historiography and Memory ==
- Anastasopoulou, M. (2022). A century of Asia Minor refugees in Greece: Flight, fight, and fraternity. Oxford University Press.
- Eser, U. (2022). Homeland as terra pericolosa: Post-catastrophe homecoming narratives of Smyrniote Greeks in early Republican Turkey. Journal of Modern Greek Studies, 40(1), 169–193.
- Exertzoglou, H. (2016). Children of memory: Narratives of the Asia Minor Catastrophe and the making of refugee identity in interwar Greece. Journal of Modern Greek Studies, 34(2), 343–366.
- Halstead, H. (2018). "Ask the Assyrians, Armenians, Kurds": Transcultural Memory and Nationalism in Greek Historical Discourse on Turkey. History and Memory, 30(2), 3–39.
- Iatrides, J. O. (1986). Missionary educators and the Asia Minor disaster: Anatolia College's move to Greece. Journal of Modern Greek Studies, 4(2), 143–157.
- Iliadou, E. (2023). "Intergenerational Harms: Border Memories and Genealogies of Harm". In Border Harms and Everyday Violence: A Prison Island in Europe (1st ed., pp. 45–71). Bristol University Press.
- Jacobs, S. L. (2017). Lemkin on three genocides: Comparing his writings on the Armenian, Assyrian, and Greek genocides. In G. N. Shirinian (Ed.), Genocide in the Ottoman Empire: Armenians, Assyrians, and Greeks, 1913–1923 (1st ed., pp. 253–273). Berghahn Books.
- Kritikakos, T. (2026). The late Ottoman genocides: Historical context, academic debates, and legacy. In Armenian, Greek, and Assyrian genocide recognition in twenty-first century Australia (pp. 23–64). Palgrave Macmillan.
- Sjöberg, E. (2019). "Right to Memory": From Catastrophe to the Politics of Identity. In The Making of the Greek Genocide: Contested Memories of the Ottoman Greek Catastrophe (1st ed., Vol. 23, pp. 54–72). Berghahn Books.
- Sjöberg, E. (2019). Introduction: Cosmopolitan memory and the Greek genocide narrative. In The making of the Greek genocide: Contested memories of the Ottoman Greek catastrophe (pp. 1–16). Berghahn Books.
- Sjöberg, E. (2019). Nationalizing genocide: The recognition process in Greece. In The making of the Greek genocide: Contested memories of the Ottoman Greek catastrophe (pp. 73–117). Berghahn Books.
- Sjöberg, E. (2019). "Three genocides, one recognition": The "Christian Holocaust". In The making of the Greek genocide: Contested memories of the Ottoman Greek catastrophe (pp. 188–222). Berghahn Books.
- Stroebel, W. (2014). Distancing disaster: Trauma, medium, and form in the Greco-Turkish War and population exchange. Journal of Modern Greek Studies, 32(2), 253–285.
- Travis, H. (2014). Constructing the "Armenian genocide": How scholars unremembered the Assyrian and Greek genocides in the Ottoman Empire. In A. L. Hinton, T. La Pointe, & D. Irvin-Erickson (Eds.), Hidden genocides: Power, knowledge, memory (pp. 170–192). Rutgers University Press.

=== Literary and testimonial works ===
- Doukas, S. (1999). A Prisoner of War's Story. University of Birmingham, Institute of Archaeology & Antiquity Centre for Byzantine, Ottoman & Modern Greek Studies.
- Faltaits, K. (2016). The Genocide of the Greeks in Turkey: Survivor Testimonies from the Nicomedia (Izmit) Massacres of 1920–1921. Cosmos.
- Halo, T. (2000). Not Even My Name. New York: Picador USA.
- Murray, A. D. (2014). Black Sea: A Naval Officer's Near East Experience. (R. Heideman, Ed.). Kindle Digital.* Soteriou, D. (1991). Farewell Anatolia. (F. A. Reed, Trans.). Athens: Kedros.

== Contemporary sources ==
Sources related to the Greek and wider Christian genocide:

- Bierstadt, E. H. (1924). The great betrayal: A survey of the Near East problem. Robert M. McBride & Company.
- Hatzidimitriou, C. G. (2005). American accounts documenting the destruction of Smyrna by the Kemalist Turkish forces, September 1922. Aristide D. Caratzas.
- Horton, G. (1926). The blight of Asia. Bobbs-Merrill.
- Massacre of the Greeks in Turkey: Story of the Tragic Fate of Hundreds of Thousands of Christian Noncombatants in the Levant. (1919). Current History, 9(3), 549–552.
- Shenk, R., & Koktzoglou, S. (Eds.). (2020). The Greek Genocide in American Naval War Diaries. University of New Orleans Press.
- Travis, H. (2017). Genocide by deportation into poverty: Western diplomats on Ottoman Christian killings and expulsions, 1914–24. In G. N. Shirinian (Ed.), Genocide in the Ottoman Empire: Armenians, Assyrians, and Greeks, 1913–1923 (1st ed., pp. 354–402). Berghahn Books.

== Academic journals ==
English language academic journals related to the subject area:

- Journal of Modern Greek Studies
- The Journal of Hellenic Studies
- Journal of the Ottoman and Turkish Studies Association
- Turkish Studies
- First World War Studies
- Genocide Studies International
- Genocide Studies and Prevention: An International Journal
- Holocaust and Genocide Studies
- Journal of Genocide Research

== See also ==
- Constantinople pogroms
- Outline of the Greek genocide
- Outline of genocide studies
- Genocides in history (before World War I)
- List of genocides
- List of ethnic cleansing campaigns
- List of massacres in Turkey
- List of massacres in Cyprus
- Twice A Stranger: How Mass Expulsion Forged Modern Greece and Turkey
- Persecution of Eastern Orthodox Christians
