= Jens-Christian Wagner =

German historian (born 1966)

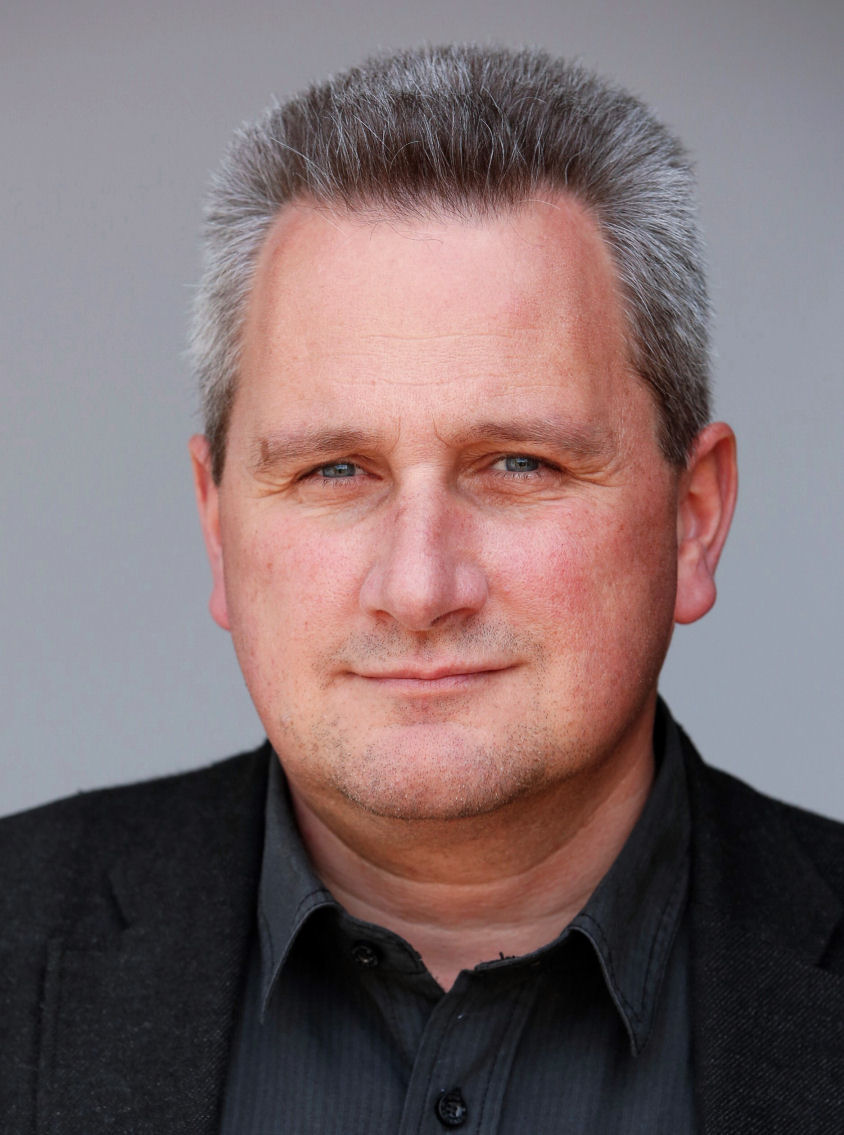
Wagner in 2015

Jens-Christian Wagner (born 1966) is a German historian who specializes in the Nazi era and the politics of memory. Wagner has published multiple academic books about Mittelbau-Dora concentration camp and its subcamps. He was the director of Mittelbau-Dora memorial from 2001, was the chairman of Lower Saxony Memorials Foundation, and became the overseer of Buchenwald and Mittelbau-Dora Memorials Foundation in 2020.

== Historical research ==
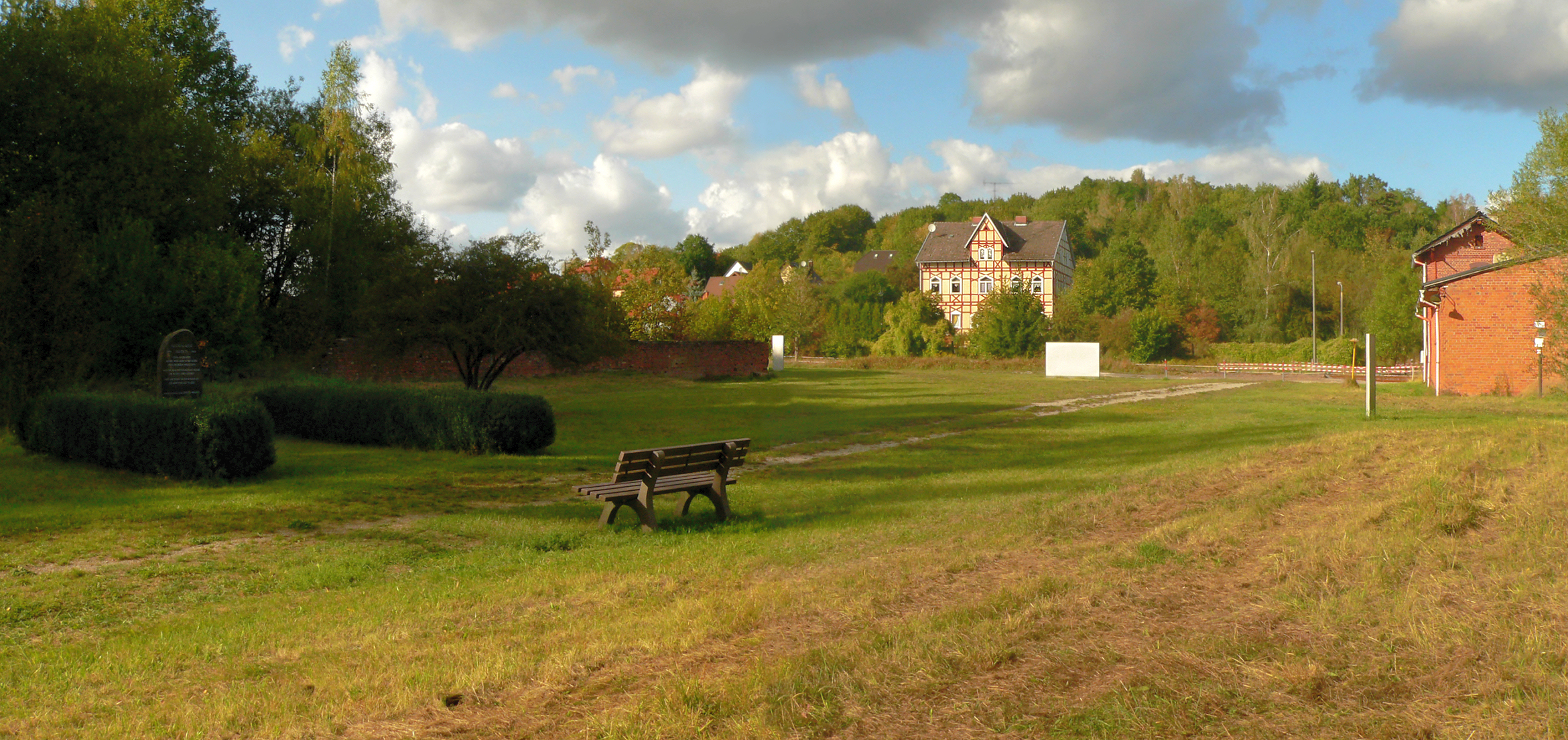
The former Appellplatz of Ellrich-Juliushütte

In 1999, Wagner received his doctorate from the University of Göttingen; his dissertation, supervised by Bernd Weisbrod, focused on the Mittelbau-Dora concentration camp and was later published as Produktion des Todes: Das KZ Mittelbau-Dora ("Production of Death: the Mittelbau-Dora concentration camp"). As of 2010, it is the only book that covers the entire history of Mittelbau-Dora. The book focuses on the collaboration between the SS and the armaments industry, the relationship between extermination and forced labor, and the position of the camp vis-a-vis its surroundings. According to reviewer Christiane Grieb, the book, unlike other studies, focuses on the victims of the camp rather than on "wonder weapons" and correctly identifies death as the main "product" of the camp. She praised the book for its in-depth research and placing the camp in its historical and spatial context. Historian Manfred Grieger stated, "Anyone interested in the history of the Kohnsteiner camp complex and the relationship between work and extermination in the concentration camp system cannot ignore this book."

In 2009, Wagner published a book, Ellrich 1944/45: Konzentrationslager und Zwangsarbeit in einer deutschen Kleinstadt ("Ellrich 1944/45: Concentration camp and forced labor in a small German town") about the Ellrich concentration camp complex, a subcamp of Mittlebau-Dora which operated in 1944 and 1945 in the Harz mountains around the town of Ellrich. Historian Panikos Panayi praised the book for its high quality and comprehensive coverage, stating that it was "a precise and detailed narrative of virtually all aspects of the camps".

== Memorial work ==
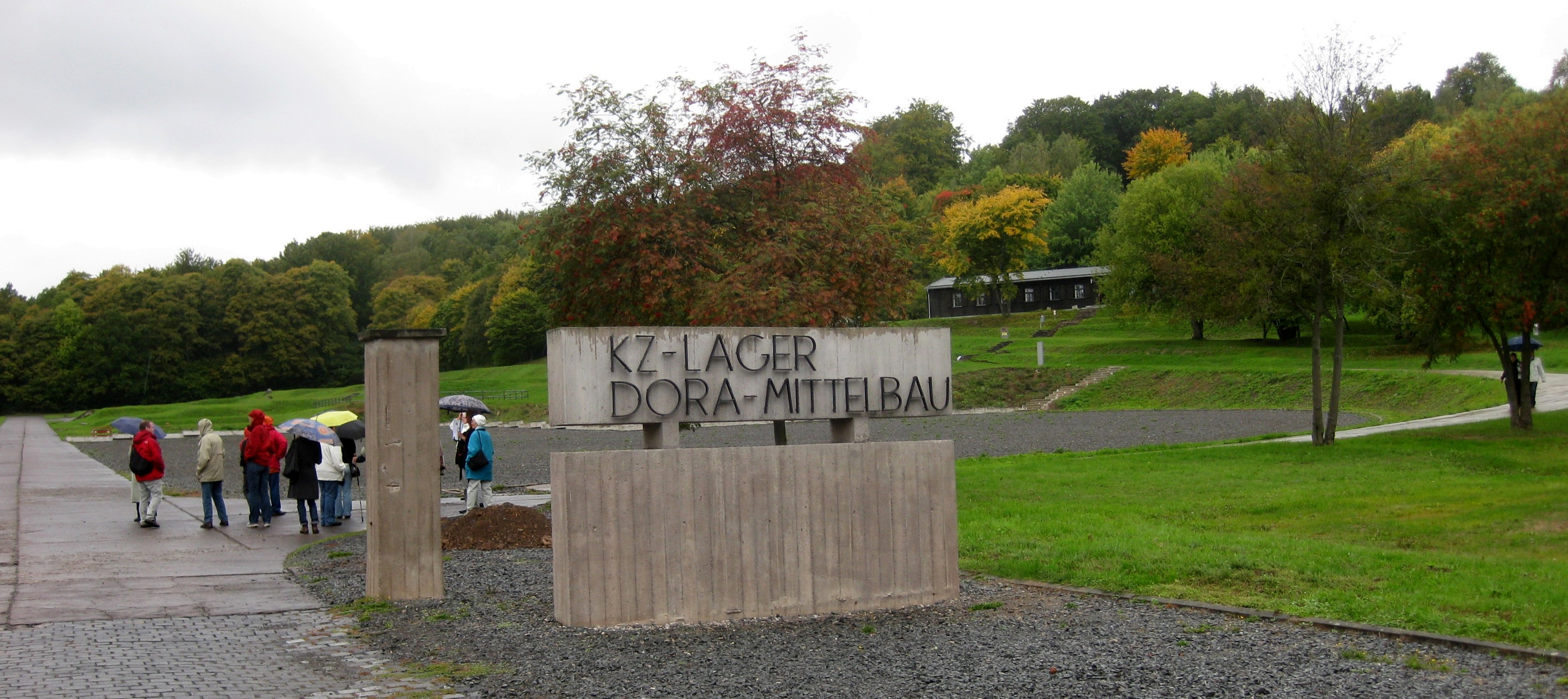
Entrance to the former Mittelbau-Dora concentration camp

Wagner has served as the director of the Mittelbau-Dora concentration camp memorial since 2001. In 2014, he was appointed chairman of the Lower Saxony Memorials Foundation whose purpose is to commemorate Nazi crimes committed in Lower Saxony, for a five-year term. In May 2020, he succeeded Volkhard Knigge as the director of Buchenwald and Mittelbau-Dora Memorials Foundation.

Wagner stated that in the late 2010s, there was an increase in hecklers at Nazi concentration camp sites who questioned historical facts and tried to downplay Nazi crimes. Wagner stated that heckling incidents occurred "on a weekly basis from people of all ages and all backgrounds, although they are almost exclusively ethnically German" and blamed politicians from Alternative for Germany (AfD) for shifting the window of what it was publicly acceptable to say. Wagner has stated that he receives threats for his work and reports them to the state prosecutor. Around the same time he made four reports to police within a week because he found right-wing extremist statements in the visitor guidebook contrary to the German constitution. In 2019, both Buchenwald and Mittelbau-Dora memorials banned AfD representatives from events "unless they credibly distance themselves from the anti-democratic, revisionist positions in their party". Guests who wear Thor Steinar, a brand of clothing associated with neo-Nazism, are asked to cover it up and are denied entry if they refuse to comply.

In 2020, he told different German media outlets that memorials should not just focus on victims, but also explain the role of perpetrators, bystanders, and profiteers of Nazi persecution. Wagner criticized the use of Nazi comparisons in protests over COVID-19 policies in Germany, which he states are "an appalling mockery and a trivialization of the crimes committed by the Nazis." After a young corona-protestor compared herself to Nazi resistance activist Sophie Scholl, he suggested that German education focused too much on the victims of Nazi persecution without addressing the question of how these people became victims.

In September 2020, there was a controversy over a speech co-written by Wagner and read by Bergen mayor Claudia Dettmar-Müller, which included the statement: "During the Second World War the SS and Wehrmacht committed unimaginable crimes on our doorstep." Local politicians from AfD as well as Social Democratic Party, Free Democratic Party and Christian Democratic Union distanced themselves from these words, despite the historical fact of war crimes of the Wehrmacht. Later in the month, he filed a complaint against the AfD in Bergen for Volksverhetzung.

In November 2020, Wagner received a call from Göttingen public prosecutor informing him that he was under investigation for publishing "defamatory facts to the detriment of Wehrmacht soldiers". The complaint, filed by a retired Bundeswehr officer, focused on his book, Armament, War and Crimes: The Wehrmacht and the Bergen-Hohne Barracks, a companion to a museum exhibition about crimes of the Wehrmacht. The proceedings were discontinued, but Wagner said he fears that "it has become socially acceptable again to talk about a clean Wehrmacht", a long-disproven myth. The prosecution was criticized by Süddeutsche Zeitung editor Ronen Steinke, who praised Wagner for "setting standards in the explanation of the German war of annihilation for many years". Green politician Jürgen Trittin called the investigation "scandalous".

In 2024, Wagner expressed support for a ban of the AfD, saying, “It cannot be that liberal democracy allows a party to participate in elections and finances its campaign that seeks to abolish liberal democracy”.

== Awards ==
In 2012, Wagner was awarded the Ordre des Palmes académiques for his services to French-German relations and his work at the Mittelbau Dora memorial.

== Works ==
- Wagner, Jens-Christian (2015) [2001]. Produktion des Todes: Das KZ Mittelbau-Dora [Production of Death: the Mittelbau-Dora concentration camp] (in German). Wallstein Verlag. ISBN 978-3-8353-2800-6.
- Wagner, Jens-Christian (2009). Ellrich 1944/45: Konzentrationslager und Zwangsarbeit in einer deutschen Kleinstadt (in German). Wallstein. ISBN 978-3-8353-0438-3.
- Wagner, Jens-Christian, ed. (2020). Zwischen Verfolgung und "Volksgemeinschaft": Kindheit und Jugend im Nationalsozialismus (in German). Wallstein Verlag GmbH. ISBN 978-3-8353-3517-2.
- Wagner, Jens-Christian, ed. (2020). Armament, War and Crimes: The Wehrmacht and the Bergen-Hohne Barracks. Wallstein Verlag GmbH. ISBN 978-3-8353-3851-7.
- Rechter Geschichtsrevisionismus in Deutschland: Formen, Felder, Ideologie. Wallstein Verlag. 2025. ISBN 978-3-8353-8797-3.
