= Utilitarian genocide =

One of five forms of genocide categorized and defined by Vahakn Dadrian

Utilitarian genocide is one of five forms of genocide categorized and defined in 1975 by genocide scholar Vahakn Dadrian. (Note: "The pioneer genocide scholar Vahakn Dadrian introduced the concept of "utilitarian genocide" in a landmark 1975 article, "A Typology of Genocide." He identified five "ideal types" of genocide, based mainly on the primary objective of the perpetrator: 1. cultural genocide, aiming at assimilation; 2. latent genocide, a by-product of war; 3. retributive genocide, localized punishment; 4. utilitarian genocide, to obtain wealth; 5. optimal genocide, aiming at total obliteration".) Utilitarian genocide is distinctly different from ideologically motivated genocides like the Holocaust and the Cambodian genocide. This form of genocide has as its aim some form of material gain, such as the seizure of territory in order to gain control of economic resources for commercial exploitation. Two given examples of this form are the genocide of indigenous peoples in Brazil and the genocide of indigenous peoples in Paraguay.

This form of genocide was highly prominent during the European colonial expansions into the Americas, Asia, and Africa. The indigenous population collapsed from a combination of murder, enslavement and disease (mostly smallpox). Dadrian has also given as further examples of utilitarian genocide the murders of Moors and Jews during the Spanish Inquisition and the deaths of Cherokee people during the westward expansion of the United States via the process of Indian removal.

This type of genocide has continued into the twentieth century, with the ongoing genocide of indigenous tribes in the rain forests of South America primarily due to industrial progress and the development of resources within their territories; as these regions are exploited for economic gain the indigenous peoples are considered a "hindrance" and are forcibly relocated or killed.

== See also ==
- Outline of genocide studies
