= Extremely Violent Societies =

2010 book by Christian Gerlach

First edition

Extremely Violent Societies: Mass Violence in the Twentieth-Century World is a 2010 book by historian Christian Gerlach in which he introduces the concept of "extremely violent society", in which "various population groups become victims of massive physical violence, in which, acting together with the organs of the state, diverse social groups participate for a multitude of reasons". Gerlach previously hypothesized this concept in a 2006 article in Journal of Genocide Research, "Extremely violent societies: an alternative to the concept of genocide".
