= United Nations General Assembly Resolution 96 (I) =

UN General Assembly Resolution 96
- Date: December 11 1946
- Meeting no.: 65
- Code: A/RES/96 (I) (Document)
- Subject: Genocide
- Voting summary: 53 voted for; None voted against; None abstained
- Result: adopted

United Nations General Assembly Resolution 96 of 11 December 1946, titled "The Crime of Genocide", was a resolution of the United Nations General Assembly during its first session that affirmed that genocide was a crime under international law. This period followed the aftermath of World War II, which exposed the devastating consequences of genocide, most notably the Holocaust. Prior to this resolution, acts of genocide were legally considered to be subsumed within crimes against humanity.

The resolution on genocide invited the United Nations Economic and Social Council to draw up an international treaty that would oblige states to prevent and punish acts of genocide. Two years later, the General Assembly adopted the 1948 Convention on the Prevention and Punishment of the Crime of Genocide, which provided a legal definition of the crime of genocide for the first time. The treaty came into force in 1951.

== See also ==
- Outline of genocide studies
