= Lonnie Athens =

American criminologist

- Born: Lonnie H. Athens; Richmond, Virginia, U.S.
- Citizenship: US
- Education: University of California at Berkeley, University of Wisconsin at Madison, Virginia Tech
- Scientific career
- Fields: Criminology
- Workplaces: Seton Hall University
- Website: www.shu.edu/profiles/lonnieathens.cfm

Lonnie Athens teaches in the criminology department at Seton Hall University and was senior research criminologist at Georgetown University Law Center.

== Life ==
=== Early life ===
Born in Richmond, Virginia, Athens lived with his parents, Irene and Pete Athens. His early environment is characterized as being violent and Athens was the victim of domestic violence. He was educated at Virginia Polytechnic Institute, where he began by majoring in political science but later changed his major to Sociology and Criminology. After graduating from Virginia Tech, Athens continued his criminology studies at the University of Wisconsin.

== Career ==
After college Athens continued to interview inmates about their criminal lives and social experiences. He based his study on George Herbert Mead, a philosopher who tried understanding how organisms acquire different traits. Athens focused on the areas of Iowa and California for his interviews. He also worked as a probation and parole officer in northern Virginia in 1986. He took all of his findings and his studies and put them together in the book, The Creation of Dangerous Violent Criminals, in which he discusses his theory and the cases he had to look at along the way. His life and violentization theory were the subject of the documentary film, Why They Kill (2017), written and directed by Giuseppe M. Fazari and based on the book by Richard Rhodes. Athens now teaches criminology at Seton Hall University.

== The Process of Violentization ==
Athens developed a theory known as "The Process of Violentization" which describes four stages in the development of violent actors.

Stage 1 Brutalization: Within this stage, the individual engages in violent demeanor through observation and demonstration. This stage is divided into three types of experiences: 1) violent subjugation-personally assaulted or threatened 2) personal horrification-witness others assaulted or threatened 3) violent coaching-taught how to execute violent behavior.

Stage 2 Belligerency: In this stage, the subject reinforces his warlike attitude to the situation by a method of different steps. With this repeating behavior they get emotionally attached to what they are doing. Because of this emotional attachment, the individual resorts to violence as a means to control and dominate others any time they are provoked.

Stage 3 Violent Performances: After surpassing the previous two stages, the individual executes violent behavior towards subordinates. In this stage, they begin to feel most comfortable with what they are doing because they start to gain respect, celebrity status, and fear from others.

Stage 4 Virulency: This stage defines the individual as violent and dangerous in which they use violence to gain control of others, earn respect, instill fear, and make others feel powerless, shamed, and humiliated; feelings that they avoid and no longer feel in themselves. The individual has created a violent self-image for himself/herself.

Types of Interpretations Athens explained the four types of interpretations and linked primary emotions related to violence. 1) Physical defensive: Fear based and focus on how a physical attack is or will be made

2) Frustrative: Anger based by which they individual notices resistance and action he/she does not want to execute.

3) Malefic: hate based in which the individual views the negative character of others and utilizes violence as his/her response.

4) Frustrative-Malefic: Hatred and anger based.

== Publications ==
- Athens, Lonnie, The Creation of Dangerous Violent Criminals, University of Illinois Press, August 1, 1992, ISBN 0-252-06262-0
- Athens, Lonnie, Violent Criminal Acts and Actors Revisited, University of Illinois Press, March 1, 1997, ISBN 0-252-06608-1
- Athens, Lonnie, Ulmer, Jeffery, Violent Acts and Violentization, Volume 4: Assessing, Applying and Developing Lonnie Athens' Theory and Research (Sociology of Crime, Law and Deviance), JAI Press, December 27, 2002, ISBN 0-7623-0905-9
- Athens, Lonnie, Violent Criminal Acts and Actors: A Symbolic Interactionist Study (International library of sociology), Routledge Kegan & Paul, June 1980, ISBN 0-7100-0342-0
