= Blood and Soil (book) =

2007 book by Ben Kiernan

Blood and Soil: A World History of Genocide and Extermination from Sparta to Darfur
- Author: Ben Kiernan
- Language: English
- Subject: World history, genocide, crimes against humanity
- Publisher: Yale University Press
- Publication date: 2007
- Publication place: United States
- Pages: 606
- ISBN: 978-0-300-10098-3

Blood and Soil: A World History of Genocide and Extermination from Sparta to Darfur (ISBN 978-0300100983) is a 2007 book by Ben Kiernan, who for thirty years has studied genocide and crimes against humanity. In Blood and Soil, Kiernan examines outbreaks of mass violence, including worldwide colonial exterminations and twentieth-century case studies, particularly the Armenian genocide, the Nazi Holocaust, Stalin's mass murders, and the Cambodian and Rwandan genocides. The book won the 2008 gold medal for the best book in History awarded by the Independent Publishers Association. In 2009, Blood and Soil won the German Studies Association's biennial Sybil Halpern Milton Memorial Book Prize for the best book published in 2007 or 2008 dealing with Nazi Germany and the Holocaust in its broadest context, covering the fields of history, political science, and other social sciences, literature, art, and photography. In June 2009, the book's German translation, Erde und Blut: Völkermord und Vernichtung von der Antike bis heute, won first place in Germany's Nonfiction Book of the Month Prize (Die Sachbücher des Monats).

== Chapter summaries ==
=== Introduction ===
In his introduction, Kiernan states the four major themes of his book, the prominence in genocidal ideology of:

- cults of antiquity
- a fetish for agriculture
- ethnic enmity
- imperial and territorial conquests

=== Part One. Early Imperial Expansion ===
==== Chapter 1. Classical Genocide and Early Modern Memory ====
Kiernan recounts genocidal events in ancient Sparta, and the destruction of Carthage by the Roman Republic; and reviews the writings of Hesiod, Cato the Elder, Julius Caesar, Virgil's Aeneid, Livy's history of Rome, and Aristotle and Aquinas on natural slavery, as sources from antiquity that were relied upon to justify later genocides. He cites, as examples of that reliance, the writings of the 13th century Dominican Albertus Magnus, the Scottish theologian John Mair, the Spanish theologian Francisco de Vitoria, Jean Bodin, Geoffrey of Monmouth, Sir Walter Ralegh, and Sir David Dalrymple. This chapter is offered in support of the author's four main themes and the common ideological features of genocide, set out in the Introduction.

==== Chapter 2. The Spanish Conquest of the New World, 1492-1600 ====
Kiernan cites references to antiquity used to justify Spanish conquest, and chronicles genocides:

- in the Caribbean following the arrival of Columbus
- in Mexico by Hernán Cortés
- in Guatemala by Pedro de Alvarado
- in Colombia by Alonso de Ojeda

==== Chapter 3. Guns and Genocide in East Asia, 1400-1600 ====
This chapter chronicles the genocidal destruction of Champa by the Vietnamese Buddhist kingdom Đại Việt in Southeast Asia in the 1400s, and genocidal wars of Japan in the 1500s, first to unify Japan, and in later invasions of Korea, with references to the justifications that were given at the time, matching the themes and common ideological features of genocide stated in the Introduction.

==== Chapter 4. Genocidal Massacres in Early Modern Southeast Asia ====
This chapter chronicles genocidal violence committed by Christians, Muslims, and Buddhists in Southeast Asia from 1590 to 1800, along with illustrations of the major themes of the book related to those events. Within this chapter are two sections on Cambodia, before and after 1600; and one section each on Java and Burma.

The sections on Cambodia describe massacres by Iberian conquistadores from 1585 to 1599, including the one at Srey Santhor in 1596, under the leadership of Diogo Veloso, Blas Ruiz de Hernán González, and Gregorio de Vargas Machuca; events during the Siamese–Cambodian War (1591–1594), which included the razing of Longvek in 1594; and descriptions of ethnic and religious violence in Cambodia over the next century and a half, including events involving the Khmer king Barom Reachea VII, the Muslim prince Ponhea Chan, and the Dutch East India Company.

The section on Java includes the territorial conquests of Sultan Agung of Mataram. The section on Burma chronicles ethnic and religious massacres from the early 1500s through the 1750s, including actions during the Toungoo dynasty (the Toungoo–Ava War, the Toungoo–Hanthawaddy War), and the Mon revolts in mid 1700s.

=== Part Two. Settler Colonialism ===
==== Introductory Note ====
As introduction to the five chapters on settler colonialism, Kiernan discusses how the intellectual history and intensive agrarian economic structures of the European colonial powers and the United States led to territorial expansion and genocidal extermination of the Indigenous inhabitants.

==== Chapter 5. The English Conquest of Ireland, 1565-1603 ====
After documenting the study of writers of antiquity during the reign of the Tudors, and particularly that of Queen Elizabeth I, by men such as Gabriel Harvey, Sir Thomas Smith, and Sir Humphrey Gilbert (who studied and discussed Livy's history of Rome and other writings discussed in Chapter 1), Kiernan ties them and their understanding of those writings to the Elizabethan policies of the conquest of Ireland. Also discussed are how those policies were based on race, land, and ideology, as exemplified by men such as Henry Sidney and Edmund Tremayne, and events during the Tudor conquest of Ireland.

==== Chapter 6. Colonial North America, 1600-1776 ====
The chapter begins with the claim that England's conquest of Ireland was precedent for colonial policy in North America. In 1578 Queen Elizabeth I authorized Sir Humphrey Gilbert (of the Irish conquest) to find "heathen and barbarous lands" not possessed by Christians and to occupy them forever. That grant was later taken over by Gilbert's half-brother, Sir Walter Ralegh. Kiernan then describes how concepts of land and ideology played a role in the ensuing colonization of North America, followed by documentation of the eradication of Powhatans in 17th century Virginia, the Pequot massacre in early New England, massacres by the Dutch in 1643, and King Phillip's War. The chapter closes with documentation of 18th century genocidal massacres (with discussion of the influence of the writings of John Locke), including encounters with the Shawnee and attacks by the Paxton Boys.

==== Chapter 7. Genocidal Violence in Nineteenth-Century Australia ====
Kiernan chronicles several genocidal conflicts with Aboriginal Australians, such as the Bathurst War and the Myall Creek massacre in New South Wales, and the Black War in Tasmania. The chapter also includes discussion of the conflicting land use cultures of the British and the Aboriginal population; the consequences of ending Aboriginal land management practices; and the role of concepts of race and land in the settler culture, with references to the writings of antiquity as well as quotes from contemporary texts such as Charles Lyell's Principles of Geography (1833) and Sir William Blackstone's Commentaries on the Laws of England (1844).

==== Chapter 8. Genocide in the United States ====
Following a review of influences from historical precedents in policies and writings, as in earlier chapters, this chapter includes descriptions of:

- Thomas Jefferson's policies towards Indigenous peoples
- the Trail of Tears and Andrew Jackson's policy of ethnic cleansing
- Stephen Austin's policies of extermination in Texas before independence from Mexico
- the policies toward Indian tribes of Mirabeau B. Lamar as president of the Republic of Texas
- genocide in California and the California Indian Wars
- genocidal massacres in the Great Plains, including the Sand Creek massacre, the Battle of Washita River, and the Marias Massacre.

In his discussion of the historical events, Kiernan quotes historical figures of the era to illustrate the ideology underlying the policies.

==== Chapter 9. Settler Genocides in Africa, 1830-1910 ====
Kiernan, again with discussion of the ideological foundations, chronicles:

- French settler colonialism in Algeria, during the period of the French conquest of Algeria, from 1830 to 1875
- German settler colonialism and genocide in Southwest Africa

Also included in this chapter is an extended discussion of the significance of the writings of Friedrich Ratzel for understanding the ideological foundations of settler colonialism.

=== Part Three. Twentieth-Century Genocides ===
==== Introductory Note ====
In his introduction to the third section of the book, Kiernan summarizes the history of genocide before the 20th century, and identifies factors that will change the nature genocide in the new century, such as large-scale production of arms, weaponry of mass destruction, rapid communications, civilian military enlistments, larger populations (that increase the need for land and the number of potential victims), and new race ideologies to justify classifying groups of people as expendable.

==== Chapter 10. The Armenian Genocide: National Chauvinism in the Waning Ottoman Empire ====
Following a presentation of the historical background, from the fourth century to the territorial collapse of the Ottoman Empire, Kiernan, with quotes from contemporaneous writers on their ideology, describes the rise of the Young Turks and how their territorial ambitions, racial hatred, and militarism led to the Armenian genocide.

==== Chapter 11. Blut und Boden: Germany and Nazi Genocide ====
Kiernan recounts The Holocaust, accompanied by documentation of its ideological and technological foundations. Ideological justifications included "scientific" racism and the call for territorial expansion, summed up in the slogan Blut und Boden. The technical foundation included the attempted total extermination of the Jewish victims of the Nazi Holocaust by the industrial murder of millions, and the use of an advanced economy and heavily armed state to invade most of Europe.

==== Chapter 12. Rice, Race, and Empire: Japan and East Asia ====
Kieran chronicles events of the Meiji era, which extended from 1868 to 1912, and its glorification of agriculture, the peasantry, and antiquity, and the call for a restoration of imperial rule. Events mentioned include:

- troops to Taiwan in 1874
- landing in Korea in 1876
- colonial rule of Taiwan in 1895
- annexation of Korea in 1910

Other events, after the Meiji era, include:

- the mass murder of Chinese civilians in the 1937 Nanjing massacre
- development and testing of biological weapons by Unit 731 and its subunit, the TAMA Detachment, subsequently used in the 1940s in eastern China

Throughout the chapter Kiernan presents documentation of the ideological foundations of expansionism, racism, and cults of violence and agriculture.

==== Chapter 13. Soviet Terror and Agriculture ====
Kiernan discusses policies and actions of Stalinist repression that caused millions of deaths, including

- Dekulakization
- forced collectivization of farmers (1928-1930)
- a series of famines (1930-1933), caused in large part by Stalinist central policy, and disproportionately impacting Ukraine and Kazakhstan
- ethnic cleansing (1935-1938) of Finns, Latvians, Estonians, Poles, Germans, Iranians and Kurds

==== Chapter 14. Maoism in China: A Rural Model of Revolutionary Violence ====
Events and consequences discussed by Kiernan in this chapter include:

- deaths from the land reform movement (1947-1952)
- the Great Leap Forward and its famine deaths
- deaths during the Cultural Revolution

==== Chapter 15. From the Mekong to the Nile: Genocide in Cambodia and Rwanda ====
In the section on the Cambodian genocide (1975-1979), Kiernan discusses:

- the influence of Vichy France, including Vichy ideology
- the atmosphere in which Pol Pot grew up, including his studies in France
- the influence of Maoist China and the Great Leap Forward on the Khmer Rouge
- racism parallels to the Nazis.

In the section on the Rwandan genocide (1994), Kiernan includes descriptions of: the colonial conquest of the Tutsi and Hutu kingdoms by Imperial Germany and subsequent rule by Belgium; post-colonial revolutions and coups; and the Hutu Power movement.

=== Epilogue: Racial and Religious Slaughter from Bangladesh to Baghdad ===
In the Epilogue Kiernan covers a number of genocides in the late 20th and early 21st centuries:

- by the Pakistan Army in Bangladesh
- the 1965 military coup in Indonesia
- the Indonesian East Timor genocide
- the Guatemalan Civil War
- the Iraq genocide of Kurds
- the Bosnian genocide
- the Darfur genocide in Sudan
- genocide proclamations of bin Laden

In the Conclusion section of the Epilogue, Kiernan states:

This book has explored four telltale characteristics of genocide that recurred regularly from the fifteenth century to the twenty-first: the preoccupation of perpetrators with race, antiquity, agriculture, and expansion.

The cure and prevention of the crime of genocide must lie, at least in part, in the diagnosis of its recurring causes and symptoms.

== See also ==
- The Years of Extermination
