= Ben Kiernan =

Australian-born American historian (born 1953)

Benedict F. "Ben" Kiernan (born 29 January 1953) is an Australian-born American historian who is the Whitney Griswold Professor Emeritus of History, Professor of International and Area Studies and Director of the Genocide Studies Program at Yale University.

== Biography ==
Kiernan visited Cambodia in his early twenties, but left before the Khmer Rouge expelled all foreigners in 1975. Though he initially doubted the reported scale of genocide then being perpetrated in Democratic Kampuchea, he changed his mind in 1978 after beginning a series of interviews with several hundred refugees from Cambodia. He learned the Khmer language, carried out research in Cambodia and among refugees abroad, and has since written many books on the topic.

From 1980 onwards, Kiernan worked with Gregory Stanton to bring the Khmer Rouge to international justice. He obtained his PhD from Monash University in Australia in 1983, under the supervision of David P. Chandler. He joined the History Department at Yale University in 1990, and founded the Cambodian Genocide Program at the Yale Center for International and Area Studies in 1994, and the comparative Genocide Studies Program in 1998. Kiernan currently teaches history courses on Southeast Asia, the Vietnam War, and genocides through the ages.

In 1995, a Khmer Rouge court indicted, tried and sentenced Kiernan in absentia for "prosecuting and terrorizing the Cambodian resistance patriots".

== Select publications and awards ==
His 2007 book Blood and Soil: A World History of Genocide and Extermination from Sparta to Darfur (Yale University Press) received the 2008 gold medal from the US Independent Publishers Association for the best work of history published in 2007, and the German Studies Association's biennial Sybil Halpern Milton Memorial Book Prize for the best book published in 2007 or 2008 dealing with Nazi Germany and the Holocaust in its broadest context, covering the fields of history, political science, and other social sciences, literature, art, and photography.

In June 2009, the book's German translation, Erde und Blut: Völkermord und Vernichtung von der Antike bis heute, won first place in Germany's Nonfiction Book of the Month Prize (Die Sachbücher des Monats).

== Criticism of Kiernan's scholarship ==
Kiernan's work before 1978, especially his work with the publication News from Kampuchea, was criticised as pro-Khmer Rouge while the Cambodian genocide was ongoing.

While Kiernan has become a critic of Khmer Rouge behaviour, Peter Rodman states that "When Hanoi turned publicly against Phnom Penh, it suddenly became respectable for many on the Left to "discover" the murderous qualities of the Khmer Rouge—qualities that had been obvious to unbiased observers for years. Kiernan fits this pattern nicely. His book even displays an eagerness to absolve of genocidal responsibility those members of the Khmer Rouge who defected to Hanoi and were later reinstalled in power in Phnom Penh and new-found PRK by the Vietnamese invasion of Cambodia in 1978."

In 1994, Kiernan was awarded a $499,000 grant by the United States Congress to help the Cambodian government document the Khmer Rouge's abuses and crimes. Stephen J. Morris, at the time a research associate in the department of government at Harvard University, cited statements Kiernan had made regarding the Khmer Rouge in the 1970s. In an opinion piece in The Wall Street Journal, Morris wrote that Kiernan's earlier opinions made him a poor choice to study Khmer Rouge abuses. Gerard Henderson, executive director of Australia's Sydney Institute, stated that Kiernan had "barracked for the Khmer Rouge when the Cambodian killing fields were choked with corpses". The Morris article was challenged by 29 Cambodia specialists who praised Kiernan as "a first-rate historian and an excellent choice for the State Department grant".

Kiernan's 2017 work Việt Nam: A History from Earliest Times to the Present has received criticism from a number of historians such as Catherine Churchman, Kathlene Baldanza, Liam Kelley, John D. Phan, and Gerard Sasges. The main criticisms levied against Kiernan are his inability to read primary sources and dependence on translations, his poor selection of secondary sources, and the lack of updating scholarship on both premodern Vietnam and the Vietnam War, among "many factual errors, misinterpretations, and problems" in the book.

== Selected bibliography ==
- Kiernan, Ben (December 1976). "Social Cohesion in Revolutionary Cambodia". Australian Outlook. 30 (3): 371–386. doi:10.1080/10357717608444576.
- Kiernan, Ben (October–December 1979). "Vietnam and the Governments and People of Kampuchea". Bulletin of Concerned Asian Scholars. 11 (4): 19–25. doi:10.1080/14672715.1979.10424016.
- Kiernan, Ben & Boua, Chanthou (1981). Peasants and Politics in Kampuchea, 1942–1981. Zed Books Ltd.
- Kiernan, Ben (2004) [1985]. How Pol Pot Came to Power: Colonialism, Nationalism, and Communism in Cambodia, 1930–1975. Yale University Press. ISBN 0-300-10262-3.
- Kiernan, Ben (1986). Cambodia: The Eastern zone Massacres.
- Kiernan, Ben (1986). Cambodge: Histoire et enjeux [Cambodia: History and challenges] (in French).
- Kiernan, Ben (2002) [1996]. The Pol Pot Regime: Race, Power and Genocide in Cambodia under the Khmer Rouge, 1975–1979. Yale University Press. ISBN 0-300-09649-6.
- Kiernan, Ben (1998). Le Génocide au Cambodge, 1975–1979: Race, idéologie, et pouvoir [The Genocide in Cambodia, 1975–1979: Race, Ideology, and Power] (in French).
- Kiernan, Ben (2007). Blood and Soil: A World History of Genocide and Extermination from Sparta to Darfur. Yale University Press. ISBN 978-0-300-10098-3.
- Kiernan, Ben (2007). Genocide and Resistance in Southeast Asia: Documentation, Denial, and Justice in Cambodia and East Timor. Transaction Publishers. ISBN 978-1-4128-0668-8.
- Kiernan, Ben (2017). Viet Nam: A History from Earliest Times to the Present. Oxford University Press. ISBN 9780190627300.

== Bibliography ==
- Phan, John D (2025), Lost Tongues of the Red River: Annamese Middle Chinese and the Origins of the Vietnamese Language, Harvard University Asia Centre
