= The Creation of Dangerous Violent Criminals =

Book about criminology by Lonnie H. Athens

- Book cover
- Author: Lonnie H. Athens
- Language: English
- Subject: Sociology, Psychology, Criminology
- Genre: Non-fiction, Social studies
- Publisher: Routledge, University of Illinois Press
- Publication date: 2018 (2nd edition)
- Pages: 190 (2nd edition)
- ISBN: 978-1138371934
- Website: Routledge page

The Creation of Dangerous Violent Criminals is a book by Lonnie H. Athens, originally published in 1989 by Routledge and University of Illinois Press; an expanded 2nd edition was published in 2018. The work explores a process by which individuals become violent criminals.

== Structure ==
The 2nd edition has a foreword by Richard Rhodes and an introduction by the author, followed by 11 chapters:

1. Dangerous Violent Criminals
2. The Key to the Creation of Dangerous Violent Criminals
3. The Research Rationale and Strategy
4. Stage One: Brutalization: Violent Subjugation
5. Stage One: Brutalization: Personal Horrification
6. Stage One: Brutalization: Violent Coaching
7. Stage Two: Belligerency
8. Stage Three: Violent Performances
9. Stage Four: Virulency
10. Theoretical Implications
11. Policy Implications

It concludes with an afterword by the author and bibliography.

== Reviews ==
- Bean, Philip (1990). "Reviewed work: The Creation of Dangerous Violent Criminals, L. H. Athens". The British Journal of Criminology. 30 (4): 528–529. doi:10.1093/oxfordjournals.bjc.a048069. JSTOR 23637621.
- Johnson, John M. (1990). "The Creation of Dangerous Violent Criminals". Symbolic Interaction. 13 (2): 293–295. doi:10.1525/si.1990.13.2.293.
- Weiner, Neil Alan (1990). "Reviewed work: The Creation of Dangerous Violent Criminals., Lonnie H. Athens". Contemporary Sociology. 19 (3): 429–431. doi:10.2307/2072484. JSTOR 2072484.

== Publication history ==
- Athens, Lonnie H. (1989), The Creation of Dangerous Violent Criminals (1st ed.), Routledge and University of Illinois Press, ISBN 978-0-252-06262-9
- Athens, L. H. (2017), The Creation of Dangerous Violent Criminals (2nd ed.), Routledge, ISBN 978-1412865364

== About the author ==
Lonnie H. Athens is a professor of Criminal Justice in the Department of Sociology, Anthropology, Social Work, and Criminal Justice at Seton Hall University.

== Similar or related works ==
- Violent Criminal Acts and Actors: A Symbolic Interactionist Study
- Domination and Subjugation in Everyday Life

== See also ==
- Criminology
