= Mass killings under communist states =

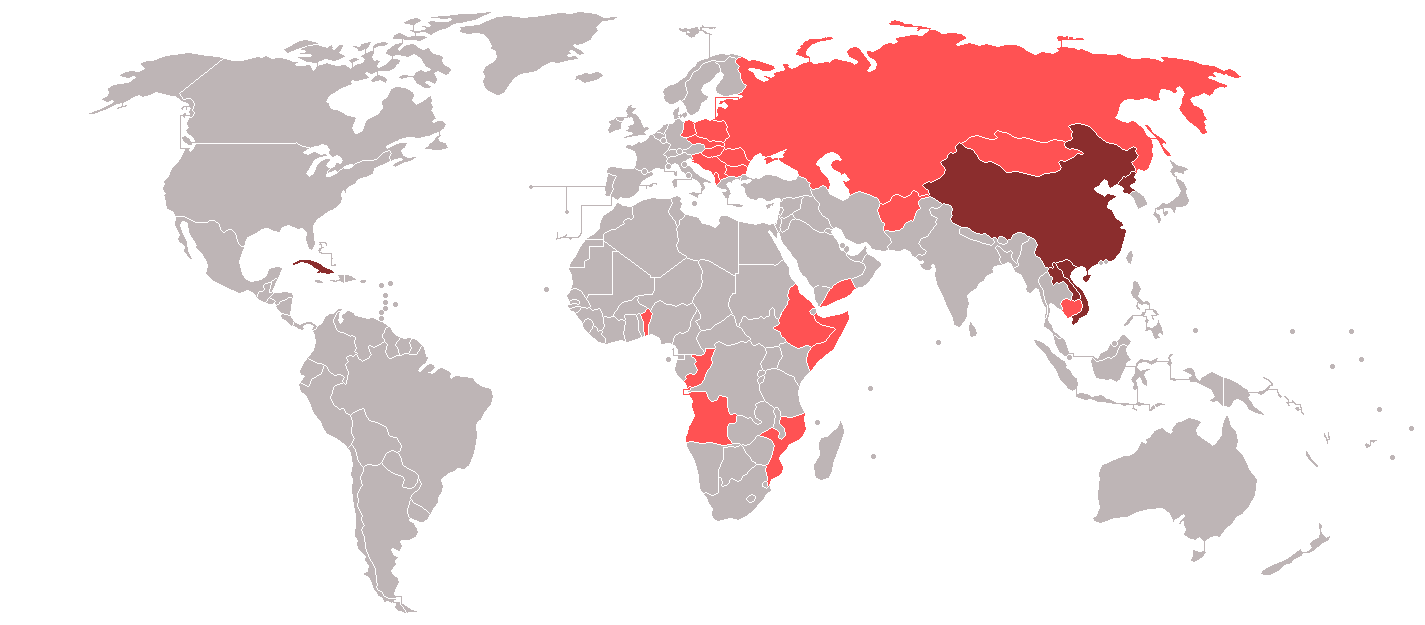
Political map of the world showing past and present communist states Communist states that existed in the past Communist states that exist in the present

Mass killings under communist states occurred through a variety of means during the 20th century, including executions, famine, deaths through forced labour, deportation, starvation, and imprisonment. Some of these events have been classified as genocides or crimes against humanity. Other terms have been used to describe these events, including classicide, democide, red holocaust, and politicide. The mass killings have been studied by authors and academics and several of them have postulated a potential link between the killings and the perpetrators' status as communist states. Some authors have tabulated a total death toll consisting of all of the excess deaths which cumulatively occurred under the rule of communist states, but these death toll estimates have been criticised. Most frequently, the states and events which are studied and included in death toll estimates are the Povolzhye famine, the Holodomor, the Asharshylyq, the Great Purge, the expulsion of Germans and the population transfer in the Soviet Union, the Great Chinese Famine and the Cultural Revolution in the People's Republic of China, the Cambodian genocide in Democratic Kampuchea (now Cambodia), and the Arduous March in the Democratic People's Republic of Korea. Estimates of individuals killed range from a low of 10–20 million to as high as 148 million.

The concept of connecting these killings to the ideology of the states that committed them has been both supported and criticized by the academic community. Some academics view this connection as causal in nature, and thus as an indictment of communism as an ideology, while other academics view such analyses as being overly simplistic and rooted in anti-communism. There is academic debate over whether the killings should be attributed to the political system, or primarily to the individual leaders of the communist states; similarly, there is debate over whether all the famines which occurred during the rule of communist states can be considered mass killings. Mass killings committed by communist states have been compared to killings which were committed by other types of states. Monuments to individuals and groups considered to be victims of communism exist in almost all the capitals of Eastern Europe, as well as many other cities in the world.

== Terminology and usage ==
Several different terms are used to describe the intentional killing of large numbers of noncombatants. According to historian Anton Weiss-Wendt, the field of comparative genocide studies has very "little consensus on defining principles such as definition of genocide, typology, application of a comparative method, and timeframe." According to professor of economics Attiat Ott, mass killing has emerged as a "more straightforward" term.

The following terminology has been used by individual authors to describe mass killings of unarmed civilians by communist governments, individually or as a whole:

- Classicide – sociologist Michael Mann has proposed classicide to mean the "intended mass killing of entire social classes." Classicide is considered "premeditated mass killing" narrower than genocide in that it targets a part of a population defined by its social status, but broader than politicide in that the group is targeted without regard to their political activity.
- Crime against humanity – historian Klas-Göran Karlsson uses crimes against humanity, which includes "the direct mass killings of politically undesirable elements, as well as forced deportations and forced labour." Karlsson acknowledges that the term may be misleading in the sense that the regimes targeted groups of their own citizens, but he considers it useful as a broad legal term which emphasizes attacks on civilian populations and because the offenses demean humanity as a whole. Historian Jacques Sémelin, as well as Michael Mann, believe that crime against humanity is more appropriate than genocide or politicide when speaking of violence by communist regimes.
- Democide – political scientist Rudolph Rummel defined democide as "the intentional killing of an unarmed or disarmed person by government agents acting in their authoritative capacity and pursuant to government policy or high command." His definition covers a wide range of deaths, including forced labor and concentration camp victims, killings by "unofficial" private groups, extrajudicial summary killings, and mass deaths due to the governmental acts of criminal omission and neglect, such as in deliberate famines as well as killings by de facto governments, such as warlords or rebels in a civil war. This definition covers any murder of any number of persons by any government, and it has been applied to killings that were perpetrated by communist regimes.
- Genocide – under the Genocide Convention, the crime of genocide generally applies to the mass murder of ethnic rather than political or social groups. The clause which granted protection to political groups was eliminated from the United Nations resolution after a second vote because many states, including the Soviet Union under Joseph Stalin, feared that it could be used to impose limitations on their right to suppress internal disturbances. Scholarly studies of genocide usually acknowledge the UN's omission of economic and political groups and use mass political killing datasets of democide and genocide and politicide or geno-politicide. The killings that were committed by the Khmer Rouge in Cambodia has been labeled a genocide or an autogenocide, and the deaths that occurred under Leninism and Stalinism in the Soviet Union, as well as those that occurred under Maoism in China, have been controversially investigated as possible cases. In particular, the Soviet famine of 1930–1933 and the Great Chinese Famine, which occurred during the Great Leap Forward, have both been "depicted as instances of mass killing underpinned by genocidal intent."
- Red holocaust – the term, which was coined by the Munich Institut für Zeitgeschichte, has been used by professor of comparative economic systems Steven Rosefielde for communist "peacetime state killings", while stating that it "could be defined to include all murders (judicially sanctioned terror-executions), criminal manslaughter (lethal forced labor and ethnic cleansing), and felonious negligent homicide (terror-starvation) incurred from insurrectionary actions and civil wars prior to state seizure, and all subsequent felonious state killings." According to historian Jörg Hackmann, this term is not popular among scholars in Germany or internationally. Historian Alexandra Laignel-Lavastine writes that usage of this term "allows the reality it describes to immediately attain, in the Western mind, a status equal to that of the extermination of the Jews by the Nazi regime." Political scientist Michael Shafir writes that the use of the term supports the "competitive martyrdom component of Double Genocide", a theory whose worst version is Holocaust obfuscation. Professor of political science George Voicu wrote that Leon Volovici, a literary historian of Jewish culture, has "rightfully condemned the abusive use of this concept as an attempt to 'usurp' and undermine a symbol specific to the history of European Jews."
- Mass killing – professor of psychology Ervin Staub defined mass killing as "killing members of a group without the intention to eliminate the whole group or killing large numbers of people without a precise definition of group membership. In a mass killing the number of people killed is usually smaller than in genocide." Referencing earlier definitions, Professors of economics Joan Esteban, Massimo Morelli, and Dominic Rohner have defined mass killings as "the killings of substantial numbers of human beings, when not in the course of military action against the military forces of an avowed enemy, under the conditions of the essential defenselessness and helplessness of the victims." The term has been defined by political scientist Benjamin Valentino as "the intentional killing of a massive number of noncombatants", where a "massive number" is defined as at least 50,000 intentional deaths over the course of five years or less. This is the most accepted quantitative minimum threshold for the term. He applied this definition to the cases of Stalin's Soviet Union, China under Mao Zedong and Cambodia under the Khmer Rouge while admitting that "mass killings on a smaller scale" also appear to have been carried out by regimes in North Korea, Vietnam, Eastern Europe (in specific nations of the Warsaw Pact, like Poland) and various nations in Africa. Alongside Valentino, political scientist Jay Ulfelder has used a threshold of 1,000 killed. Professor of peace and conflict studies Alex J. Bellamy states that 14 of the 38 instances of "mass killing since 1945 perpetrated by non-democratic states outside the context of war" were by communist governments. Professor of political science Atsushi Tago and professor of international relations Frank W. Wayman used mass killing from Valentino and concluded that even with a lower threshold (10,000 killed per year, 1,000 killed per year, or even 1 killed per year) "autocratic regimes, especially communist, are prone to mass killing generically, but not so strongly inclined (i.e. not statistically significantly inclined) toward geno-politicide." According to professor of economics Attiat F. Ott and associate professor of economics Sang Hoo Bae, there is a general consensus that mass killing constitutes the act of intentionally killing a number of non-combatants, but that number can range from as few as four to more than 50,000 people. Sociologist Yang Su used a definition of mass killing from Valentino but allows as a "significant number" more than 10 killed in one day in one town. He used collective killing for analysis of mass killing in areas smaller than a whole country that may not meet Valentino's threshold.
- Politicide – genocide scholar Barbara Harff defines genocide and politicide, sometimes shortened as geno-politicide, to include the killing of political, economic, ethnic, and cultural groups, some of whom would not otherwise be covered by the Genocide Convention. Political science Manus I. Midlarsky uses politicide to describe an arc of large-scale killing from the western parts of the Soviet Union to China and Cambodia. In his book The Killing Trap: Genocide in the Twentieth Century, Midlarsky raises similarities between the killings of Stalin and Pol Pot.

== Estimates ==
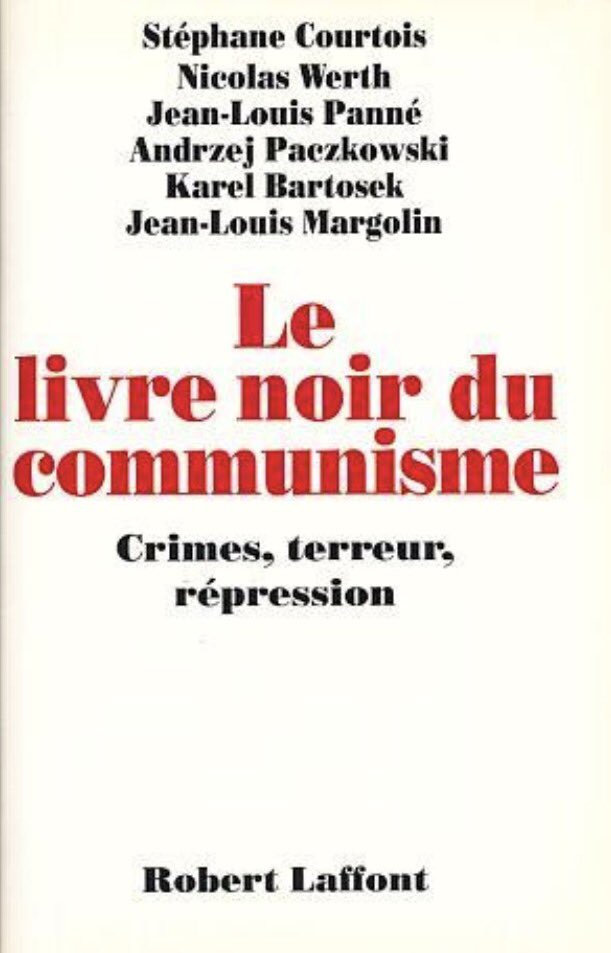
Cover of the first edition of The Black Book of Communism

According to historian Klas-Göran Karlsson, discussions of the number of victims of communist regimes have been "extremely extensive and ideologically biased." Any attempt to estimate a total number of killings under communist regimes depends greatly on definitions, resulting in a vast range of estimates ranging from a low of 10–20 million to as high as 148 million. Political scientist Rudolph Rummel and historian Mark Bradley have written that, while the exact numbers have been in dispute, the order of magnitude is not. Professor Barbara Harff says that Rummel and other genocide scholars are focused primarily on establishing patterns and testing various theoretical explanations of genocides and mass killings. They work with large data sets that describe mass mortality events globally and have to rely on selective data provided by country experts; researchers cannot expect absolute precision, and it is not required as a result of their work.

The usefulness of using communist regimes as a category under which to count killings has been disputed. Historian Alexander Dallin argued that the idea to group together different countries such as Afghanistan and Hungary has no adequate explanation. During the Cold War era, some authors (Todd Culberston), dissidents (Aleksandr Solzhenitsyn), and anti-communists in general attempted to make both country-specific and global estimates. Scholars of communism have mainly focused on individual countries, while genocide scholars have attempted to provide a more global perspective, maintaining that their goal is not reliability but establishing patterns. Scholars of communism have generally debated on estimates for the Soviet Union instead of for all communist regimes, a practice which was popularized by the introduction to The Black Book of Communism but which was controversial. Among scholars of communism, Soviet specialists Michael Ellman and J. Arch Getty have criticized estimates for relying on émigré sources, hearsay, and rumor as evidence, and cautioned that historians should instead utilize archive material. Such scholars distinguish between historians who base their research on archive materials and those whose estimates are based on witnesses evidence and other data that they consider unreliable. Soviet specialist Stephen G. Wheatcroft says that historians relied on Solzhenitsyn to support their higher estimates but research in the state archives supported the lower estimates, and that the popular press has continued to include serious errors that should not be cited, or relied on, in academia. Rummel was also another widely used and cited source.

Notable estimate attempts include the following:

- In 1993, Zbigniew Brzezinski, former National Security Advisor to Jimmy Carter, wrote that "the failed effort to build communism in the twentieth century consumed the lives of almost 60,000,000."
- In 1994, Rummel's book Death by Government included about 110 million people, foreign and domestic, killed by communist democide from 1900 to 1987. This total excluded deaths from the Great Chinese Famine of 1958–1961 due to Rummel's then belief that "although Mao's policies were responsible for the famine, he was misled about it, and finally when he found out, he stopped it and changed his policies." Rummel would later revise his estimate from 110 million to about 148 million due to additional information about Mao's culpability in the Great Chinese Famine from Mao: The Unknown Story, including Jon Halliday and Jung Chang's estimated 38 million famine deaths.
  - In 2004, historian Tomislav Dulić criticized Rummel's estimate of the number killed in Tito's Yugoslavia as an overestimation based on the inclusion of low-quality sources, and stated that Rummel's other estimates may suffer from the same problem if he used similar sources for them. Rummel responded with a critique of Dulić's analysis. Karlsson says that Rummel's thesis of "extreme intentionality in Mao" for the famine is "hardly an example of a serious and empirically-based writing of history", and describes Rummel's 61,911,000 estimate for the Soviet Union as being based on "an ideological preunderstanding and speculative and sweeping calculations".
- In 1997, historian Stéphane Courtois's introduction to The Black Book of Communism, an impactful yet controversial work written about the history of communism in the 20th century, gave a "rough approximation, based on unofficial estimates". The subtotals listed by Courtois added up to 94.36 million killed. Nicolas Werth and Jean-Louis Margolin, contributing authors to the book, criticized Courtois as obsessed with reaching a 100 million overall total.
  - In his foreword to the 1999 English edition, Martin Malia wrote that "a grand total of victims variously estimated by contributors to the volume at between 85 million and 100 million." Historian Michael David-Fox states that Malia is able to link disparate regimes, from radical Soviet industrialists to the anti-urbanists of the Khmer Rouge, under the guise of a "generic communism" category "defined everywhere down to the common denominator of party movements founded by intellectuals." Courtois's attempt to equate Nazism and communist regimes was controversial.
- In 2005, professor Benjamin Valentino stated that the number of non-combatants killed by communist regimes in the Soviet Union, China, and Cambodia alone ranged from a low of 21 million to a high of 70 million.
- In 2010, professor of economics Steven Rosefielde wrote in Red Holocaust that the internal contradictions of communist regimes caused the killing of approximately 60 million people and perhaps tens of millions more.
- In 2012, academic Alex J. Bellamy wrote that a "conservative estimate puts the total number of civilians deliberately killed by communists after the Second World War between 6.7 million and 15.5 million people, with the true figure probably much higher."
- In 2014, professor of Chinese politics Julia Strauss wrote that while there was the beginning of a scholarly consensus on figures of around 20 million killed in the Soviet Union and 2–3 million in Cambodia, there was no such consensus on numbers for China.
- In 2017, historian Stephen Kotkin wrote in The Wall Street Journal that 65 million people died prematurely under communist regimes according to demographers, and those deaths were a result of "mass deportations, forced labor camps and police-state terror" but mostly "from starvation as a result of its cruel projects of social engineering."

=== Criticism of estimates ===
Criticism of the estimates is mostly focused on three aspects, namely that the estimates are based on sparse and incomplete data, making significant errors inevitable, that the figures are skewed to higher possible values, and that victims of civil wars, Holodomor and other famines, and wars involving communist governments should not be counted. Criticism also includes arguments that these estimates ignore lives saved by communist modernization and that they engage in comparisons and equations with Nazism, which are described by scholars as Holocaust obfuscation, Holocaust trivialization, and anti-communist oversimplifications. In addition, the communist grouping as applied by Courtois and Malia in The Black Book of Communism has been claimed to have no adequate explanation by historian Alexander Dallin, while Malia has been able to link disparate regimes, from radical Soviet industrialists to the anti-urbanists of the Khmer Rouge, under the guise of a "generic communism" category "defined everywhere down to the common denominator of party movements founded by intellectuals."

Criticism of Rummel's estimates have focused on two aspects, namely his choice of data sources and his statistical approach. According to Barbara Harff, the historical sources Rummel based his estimates upon can rarely serve as sources of reliable figures. The statistical approach Rummel used to analyze big sets of diverse estimates may lead to dilution of useful data with noisy ones.

Another criticism, as articulated by ethnographer and postsocialist gender studies scholar Kristen Ghodsee and political scientist Laure Neumayer, is that the body-counting reflects an anti-communist point of view, is mainly approached by anti-communist scholars, and is part of the popular "victims of communism" narrative, who have frequently used the 100 million figure from the introduction to The Black Book of Communism, which is used not only to discredit the communist movement, but the whole political left. They say the same body-counting can be easily applied to other ideologies or systems, such as capitalism and colonialism. However, alongside philosopher Scott Sehon, Ghodsee wrote that "quibbling about numbers is unseemly. What matters is that many, many people were killed by communist regimes."

== Proposed causes and enabling factors ==
Communist party mass killings have been criticized by members of the political right, who state that the mass killings are an indictment of communism as an ideology, and has also been criticized by other socialists such as anarchists, communists, democratic socialists, libertarian socialists, and Marxists. Opponents of this hypothesis, including those on the political left and communist party members, state that these killings were aberrations caused by specific authoritarian regimes, and not caused by communism itself, and point to mass deaths that they say were caused by anti-communism and capitalism as a counterpoint to those killings.

=== Ideology ===
Historian Klas-Göran Karlsson writes: "Ideologies are systems of ideas, which cannot commit crimes independently. However, individuals, collectives and states that have defined themselves as communist have committed crimes in the name of communist ideology, or without [sic] naming communism as the direct source of motivation for their crimes." John Gray, Daniel Goldhagen, and Richard Pipes consider the ideology of communism to be a significant causative factor in mass killings. In the introduction to The Black Book of Communism, Stéphane Courtois claims an association between communism and criminality, stating that "Communist regimes ... turned mass crime into a full-blown system of government", while adding that this criminality lies at the level of ideology rather than state practice.

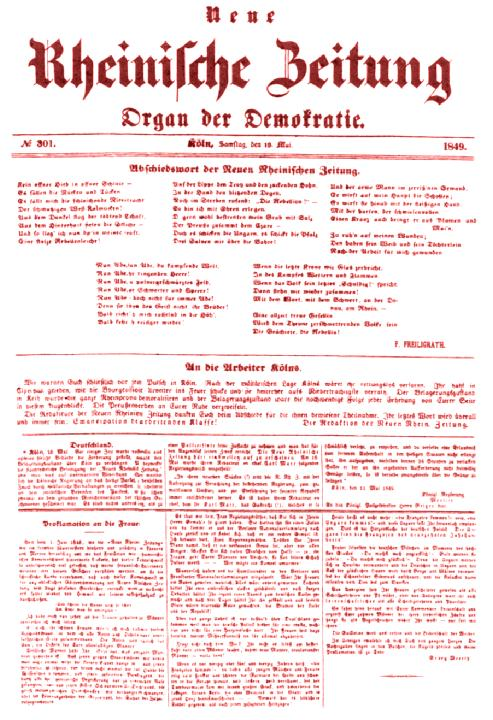
The last issue, printed in red ink, of Karl Marx's journal Neue Rheinische Zeitung from 19 May 1849

Professor Mark Bradley writes that communist theory and practice has often been in tension with human rights and most communist states followed the lead of Karl Marx in rejecting "Enlightenment-era inalienable individual political and civil rights" in favor of "collective economic and social rights." Christopher J. Finlay posits that Marxism legitimates violence without any clear limiting principle because it rejects moral and ethical norms as constructs of the dominant class, and states that "it would be conceivable for revolutionaries to commit atrocious crimes in bringing about a socialist system, with the belief that their crimes will be retroactively absolved by the new system of ethics put in place by the proletariat." Rustam Singh states that Marx had alluded to the possibility of peaceful revolution; after the failed Revolutions of 1848, Singh states that Marx emphasized the need for violent revolution and revolutionary terror.

Literary historian George Watson cited an 1849 article written by Friedrich Engels called "The Hungarian Struggle" and published in Marx's journal Neue Rheinische Zeitung, and commented that "entire nations would be left behind after a workers' revolution against the bourgeoisie, feudal remnants in a socialist age, and since they could not advance two steps at a time, they would have to be killed. They were racial trash, as Engels called them, and fit only for the dung-heap of history." One book review criticized this interpretation, maintaining that "what Marx and Engels are calling for is ... at the very least a kind of cultural genocide; but it is not obvious, at least from Watson's citations, that actual mass killing, rather than (to use their phraseology) mere 'absorption' or 'assimilation', is in question." Talking about Engels's 1849 article, historian Andrzej Walicki states: "It is difficult to deny that this was an outright call for genocide." Jean-François Revel writes that Joseph Stalin recommended study of the 1849 Engels article in his 1924 book On Lenin and Leninism.

According to Rummel, the killings committed by communist regimes can best be explained as the result of the marriage between absolute power and the absolutist ideology of Marxism. Rummel states that "communism was like a fanatical religion. It had its revealed text and its chief interpreters. It had its priests and their ritualistic prose with all the answers. It had a heaven, and the proper behavior to reach it. It had its appeal to faith. And it had its crusades against nonbelievers. What made this secular religion so utterly lethal was its seizure of all the state's instruments of force and coercion and their immediate use to destroy or control all independent sources of power, such as the church, the professions, private businesses, schools, and the family." Rummels writes that Marxist communists saw the construction of their utopia as "though a war on poverty, exploitation, imperialism and inequality. And for the greater good, as in a real war, people are killed. And, thus, this war for the communist utopia had its necessary enemy casualties, the clergy, bourgeoisie, capitalists, wreckers, counterrevolutionaries, rightists, tyrants, rich, landlords, and noncombatants that unfortunately got caught in the battle. In war millions may die, but the cause may be well justified, as in the defeat of Hitler and an utterly racist Nazism. And to many communists, the cause of a communist utopia was such as to justify all the deaths."

Benjamin Valentino writes that "apparently high levels of political support for murderous regimes and leaders should not automatically be equated with support for mass killing itself. Individuals are capable of supporting violent regimes or leaders while remaining indifferent or even opposed to specific policies that these regimes and carried out." Valentino quotes Vladimir Brovkin as saying that "a vote for the Bolsheviks in 1917 was not a vote for Red Terror or even a vote for a dictatorship of the proletariat." According to Valentino, such strategies were so violent because they economically dispossess large numbers of people, commenting: "Social transformations of this speed and magnitude have been associated with mass killing for two primary reasons. First, the massive social dislocations produced by such changes have often led to economic collapse, epidemics, and, most important, widespread famines. ... The second reason that communist regimes bent on the radical transformation of society have been linked to mass killing is that the revolutionary changes they have pursued have clashed inexorably with the fundamental interests of large segments of their populations. Few people have proved willing to accept such far-reaching sacrifices without intense levels of coercion." According to Jacques Sémelin, "communist systems emerging in the twentieth century ended up destroying their own populations, not because they planned to annihilate them as such, but because they aimed to restructure the 'social body' from top to bottom, even if that meant purging it and recarving it to suit their new Promethean political imaginaire."

Daniel Chirot and Clark McCauley write that, especially in Joseph Stalin's Soviet Union, Mao Zedong's China, and Pol Pot's Cambodia, a fanatical certainty that socialism could be made to work motivated communist leaders in "the ruthless dehumanization of their enemies, who could be suppressed because they were 'objectively' and 'historically' wrong. Furthermore, if events did not work out as they were supposed to, then that was because class enemies, foreign spies and saboteurs, or worst of all, internal traitors were wrecking the plan. Under no circumstances could it be admitted that the vision itself might be unworkable, because that meant capitulation to the forces of reaction." Michael Mann writes that communist party members were "ideologically driven, believing that in order to create a new socialist society, they must lead in socialist zeal. Killings were often popular, the rank-and-file as keen to exceed killing quotas as production quotas." According to Vladimir Tismăneanu, "the Communist project, in such countries as the USSR, China, Cuba, Romania, or Albania, was based precisely on the conviction that certain social groups were irretrievably alien and deservedly murdered." Alex Bellamy writes that "communism's ideology of selective extermination" of target groups was first developed and applied by Joseph Stalin but that "each of the communist regimes that massacred large numbers of civilians during the Cold War developed their own distinctive account", while Steven T. Katz states that distinctions based on class and nationality, stigmatized and stereotyped in various ways, created an "otherness" for victims of communist rule that was important for legitimating oppression and death. Martin Shaw writes that "nationalist ideas were at the heart of many mass killings by Communist states", beginning with Stalin's "new nationalist doctrine of 'socialism in one country'", and killing by revolutionary movements in the Third World was done in the name of national liberation.

=== Political system ===
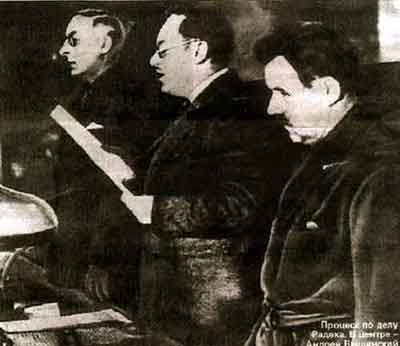
Prosecutor General Andrey Vyshinsky (centre) reading the 1937 indictment against Karl Radek during the second Moscow Trial

Anne Applebaum writes that "without exception, the Leninist belief in the one-party state was and is characteristic of every communist regime" and "the Bolshevik use of violence was repeated in every communist revolution." Phrases which were first uttered by Vladimir Lenin and Cheka founder Felix Dzerzhinsky were uttered all over the world. Applebaum states that as late as 1976, Mengistu Haile Mariam unleashed a Red Terror in Ethiopia. To his colleagues in the Bolshevik government, Lenin was quoted as saying: "If we are not ready to shoot a saboteur and White Guardist, what sort of revolution is that?".

Robert Conquest stated that Stalin's purges were not contrary to the principles of Leninism, rather, they were a natural consequence of the system which was established by Lenin, who personally ordered the killing of local groups of class enemy hostages. Alexander Nikolaevich Yakovlev, architect of perestroika and glasnost and later head of the Presidential Commission for the Victims of Political Repression, elaborates on this point, stating: "The truth is that in punitive operations Stalin did not think up anything that was not there under Lenin: executions, hostage taking, concentration camps, and all the rest." Historian Robert Gellately concurs, commenting: "To put it another way, Stalin initiated very little that Lenin had not already introduced or previewed."

Stephen Hicks of Rockford College ascribes the violence characteristic of 20th-century socialist rule to these collectivist regimes' abandonment of protections of civil rights and rejection of the values of civil society. Hicks writes that whereas "in practice every liberal capitalist country has a solid record for being humane, for by and large respecting rights and freedoms, and for making it possible for people to put together fruitful and meaningful lives", in socialism "practice has time and again proved itself more brutal than the worst dictatorships prior to the twentieth century. Each socialist regime has collapsed into dictatorship and begun killing people on a huge scale."

Eric D. Weitz states that the mass killing in communist states is a natural consequence of the failure of the rule of law, commonly seen during periods of social upheaval in the 20th century. For both communist and non-communist mass killings, "genocides occurred at moments of extreme social crisis, often generated by the very policies of the regimes", and are not inevitable but are political decisions. Steven Rosefielde writes that communist rulers had to choose between changing course and "terror-command" and more often than not, they chose the latter. Michael Mann posits that a lack of institutionalized authority structures meant that a chaotic mix of both centralized control and party factionalism were factors which contributed to the killings.

=== Leaders ===
Professor Matthew Krain states that many scholars have pointed to revolutions and civil wars as providing the opportunity for radical leaders and ideologies to gain power and the preconditions for mass killing by the state. Professor Nam Kyu Kim writes that exclusionary ideologies are critical to explaining mass killing, but the organizational capabilities and individual characteristics of revolutionary leaders, including their attitudes towards risk and violence, are also important. Besides opening up political opportunities for new leaders to eliminate their political opponents, revolutions bring to power leaders who are more apt to commit large-scale acts of violence against civilians in order to legitimize and strengthen their own power. Genocide scholar Adam Jones states that the Russian Civil War was very influential on the emergence of leaders like Stalin and it also accustomed people to "harshness, cruelty, terror." Martin Malia called the "brutal conditioning" of the two World Wars important to understanding communist violence, although not its source.

Historian Helen Rappaport describes Nikolay Yezhov, the bureaucrat who was in charge of the NKVD during the Great Purge, as a physically diminutive figure of "limited intelligence" and "narrow political understanding. ... Like other instigators of mass murder throughout history, [he] compensated for his lack of physical stature with a pathological cruelty and the use of brute terror." Russian and world history scholar John M. Thompson places personal responsibility directly on Joseph Stalin. According to him, "much of what occurred only makes sense if it stemmed in part from the disturbed mentality, pathological cruelty, and extreme paranoia of Stalin himself. Insecure, despite having established a dictatorship over the party and country, hostile and defensive when confronted with criticism of the excesses of collectivization and the sacrifices required by high-tempo industrialization, and deeply suspicious that past, present, and even yet unknown future opponents were plotting against him, Stalin began to act as a person beleaguered. He soon struck back at enemies, real or imaginary." Professors Pablo Montagnes and Stephane Wolton posit that the purges in the Soviet Union and China can be attributed to the personalist leadership of Stalin and Mao, who were incentivized by having both control of the security apparatus used to carry out the purges and control of the appointment of replacements for those purged. Slovenian philosopher Slavoj Žižek attributes Mao allegedly viewing human life as disposable to his "cosmic perspective" on humanity.

American historian and author William Rubinstein wrote that "Most of the millions who perished at the hands of Stalin, Mao Tse-tung, Pol Pot and the other communist dictators died because the party's leaders believed they belonged to a dangerous or subversive social class or political grouping."

== Debate about famines ==
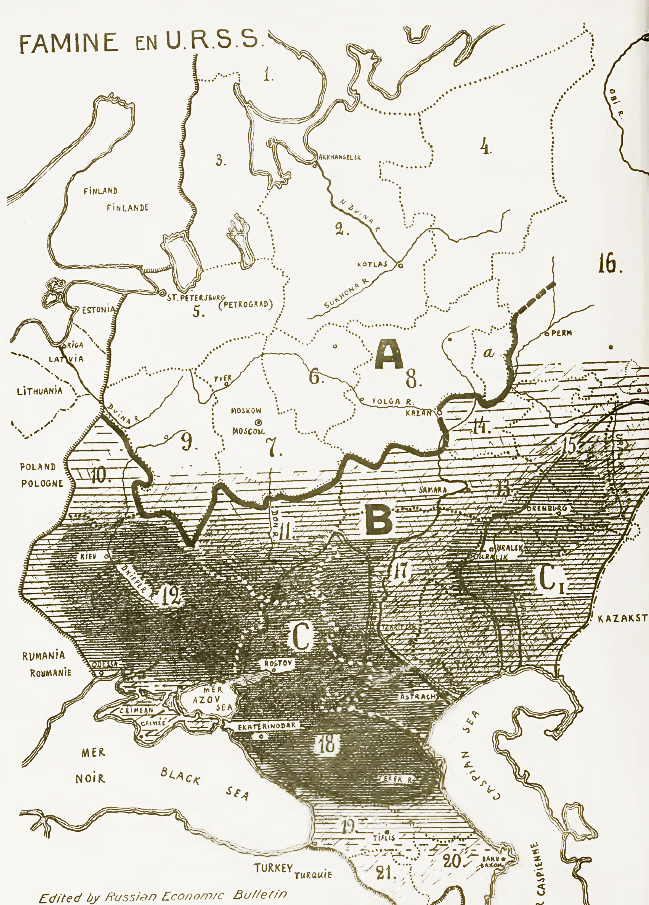
The Soviet famine of 1932–1933, with areas where the effects of famine were most severe shaded

According to historian J. Arch Getty, over half of the 100 million deaths which are attributed to communism were due to famines. Stéphane Courtois posits that many communist regimes caused famines during their efforts to forcibly collectivize agriculture and they systematically used it as a weapon by controlling the food supply and distributing food on a political basis. Courtois states that "in the period after 1918, only communist countries experienced such famines, which led to the deaths of hundreds of thousands, and in some cases millions, of people. And again in the 1980s, two African countries that claimed to be Marxist–Leninist, Ethiopia and Mozambique, were the only such countries to suffer these deadly famines."

Stephen G. Wheatcroft, R. W. Davies, and Mark Tauger reject the idea that the Ukrainian famine was an act of genocide that was intentionally inflicted by the Soviet government. Wheatcroft says that the Soviet government's policies during the famine were criminal acts of fraud and manslaughter, though not outright murder or genocide. Joseph Stalin biographer Stephen Kotkin supports a similar view, stating that while "there is no question of Stalin's responsibility for the famine" and many deaths could have been prevented if not for the "insufficient" and counterproductive Soviet measures, there is no evidence for Stalin's intention to kill the Ukrainians deliberately. According to history professor Ronald Grigor Suny, most scholars view the famine in Ukraine not as a genocide but rather as the result of badly conceived and miscalculated Soviet economic policies. Getty posits that the "overwhelming weight of opinion among scholars working in the new archives is that the terrible famine of the 1930s was the result of Stalinist bungling and rigidity rather than some genocidal plan."

Some historians conclude that the famine was planned and exacerbated by Joseph Stalin in order to eliminate a Ukrainian independence movement. Oleksandr Kramarenko argues that this conclusion is supported by Raphael Lemkin's original definition of genocide, which included "the deliberate extermination of social groups." The Genocide Convention, which Lemkin campaigned to establish, did not include political killing in its definition of genocide under pressure from the USSR. Lemkin, James Mace, Norman Naimark, Timothy Snyder and Anne Applebaum have called the Holodomor a genocide and the intentional result of Stalinist policies. According to Lemkin, Holodomor "is a classic example of the Soviet genocide, the longest and most extensive experiment in Russification, namely the extermination of the Ukrainian nation". Lemkin said that in order for the Soviet Union to accomplish its aims of Russification and collectivization in Ukraine, it did not need to follow the pattern of the Holocaust. Because Ukraine was so populous, and its religious, intellectual and political leadership was comparatively small, Instead the "Soviet genocide" consisted of four steps: 1) extermination of the Ukrainian national elite 2) liquidation of the Ukrainian Autocephalous Orthodox Church 3) extermination of a significant part of the Ukrainian peasantry as "custodians of traditions, folklore and music, national language and literature 4) populating the territory with other nationalities with intent of mixing Ukrainians with them, which would eventually lead to the dissolvance of the Ukrainian nation.

Benjamin Valentino writes: "Although not all the deaths due to famine in these cases were intentional, communist leaders directed the worst effects of famine against their suspected enemies and used hunger as a weapon to force millions of people to conform to the directives of the state." Daniel Goldhagen says that in some cases deaths from famine should not be distinguished from mass murder, commenting: "Whenever governments have not alleviated famine conditions, political leaders decided not to say no to mass death – in other words, they said yes." Goldhagen says that instances of this occurred in the Mau Mau rebellion, the Great Leap Forward, the Nigerian Civil War, the Eritrean War of Independence, and the War in Darfur. Martin Shaw posits that if a leader knew the ultimate result of their policies would be mass death by famine, and they continue to enact them anyway, these deaths can be understood as intentional.

Economics professor Michael Ellman is critical of the fixation on a "uniquely Stalinist evil" when it comes to excess deaths from famines. Ellman posits that mass deaths from famines are not a "uniquely Stalinist evil", commenting that throughout Russian history, famines, and droughts have been a common occurrence, including the Russian famine of 1921–1922, which occurred before Stalin came to power. He also states that famines were widespread throughout the world in the 19th and 20th centuries in countries such as India, Ireland, Russia and China. According to Ellman, the G8 "are guilty of mass manslaughter or mass deaths from criminal negligence because of their not taking obvious measures to reduce mass deaths" and Stalin's "behaviour was no worse than that of many rulers in the nineteenth and twentieth centuries."

== Comparative studies of communist mass killings and other mass killings ==
Several authors have compared the mass killings under communist regimes to other mass killings, reaching varying conclusions about the extent of them.

Daniel Goldhagen argues that 20th century communist regimes "have killed more people than any other regime type." Other scholars in the fields of communist studies and genocide studies, such as Steven Rosefielde and Benjamin Valentino, have made similar conclusions. Rosefielde states that it is possible to conclude that the "Red Holocaust" killed more non-combatants than "Ha Shoah" and "Japan's Asian holocaust" combined, and it "was at least as heinous, given the singularity of Hitler's genocide." Rosefielde also writes that "while it is fashionable to mitigate the Red Holocaust by observing that capitalism killed millions of colonials in the twentieth century, primarily through man-made famines, no inventory of such felonious negligent homicides comes close to the Red Holocaust total."

Seumas Milne has criticized the emphasis on communism when assigning blame for famines, saying there is "moral blindness displayed towards the record of colonialism," which he calls a "third leg of 20th-century tyranny." Milne laments that while "there is a much-lauded Black Book of Communism, [there exists] no such comprehensive indictment of the colonial record." He writes that authors who overemphasize the role of communism in 20th century atrocities "relativise the unique crimes of Nazism, bury those of colonialism and feed the idea that any attempt at radical social change will always lead to suffering, killing and failure." Jon Wiener makes a similar assertion while comparing the Holodomor and the Bengal famine of 1943, stating that Winston Churchill's role in the Bengal famine "seems similar to Stalin's role in the Ukrainian famine." Historian Mike Davis, author of Late Victorian Holocausts, draws comparisons between the Great Chinese Famine and the Indian famines of the late 19th century, arguing that in both instances the governments which oversaw the response to the famines deliberately chose not to alleviate conditions and as such bear responsibility for the scale of deaths in said famines. Economic anthropologist Jason Hickel and Dylan Sullivan suggest that the number of excess deaths during the apex of British colonialism in India rises to around 100 million, which is greater than all the famine deaths that have been attributed to communist governments combined.

Mark Aarons states that right-wing authoritarian regimes and dictatorships which were backed by Western powers committed atrocities and mass killings that rivaled the atrocities and mass killings that were committed in the communist world, citing examples such as the Indonesian occupation of East Timor, the Indonesian mass killings of 1965–1966, the "disappearances" in Guatemala during the civil war, and the assassinations and state terrorism that were associated with Operation Condor throughout South America. Vincent Bevins argues that the anti-communist mass killings that were perpetrated during the Cold War have been far more impactful on shaping the contemporary world than communist mass killings have been.

== Memorials and museums ==
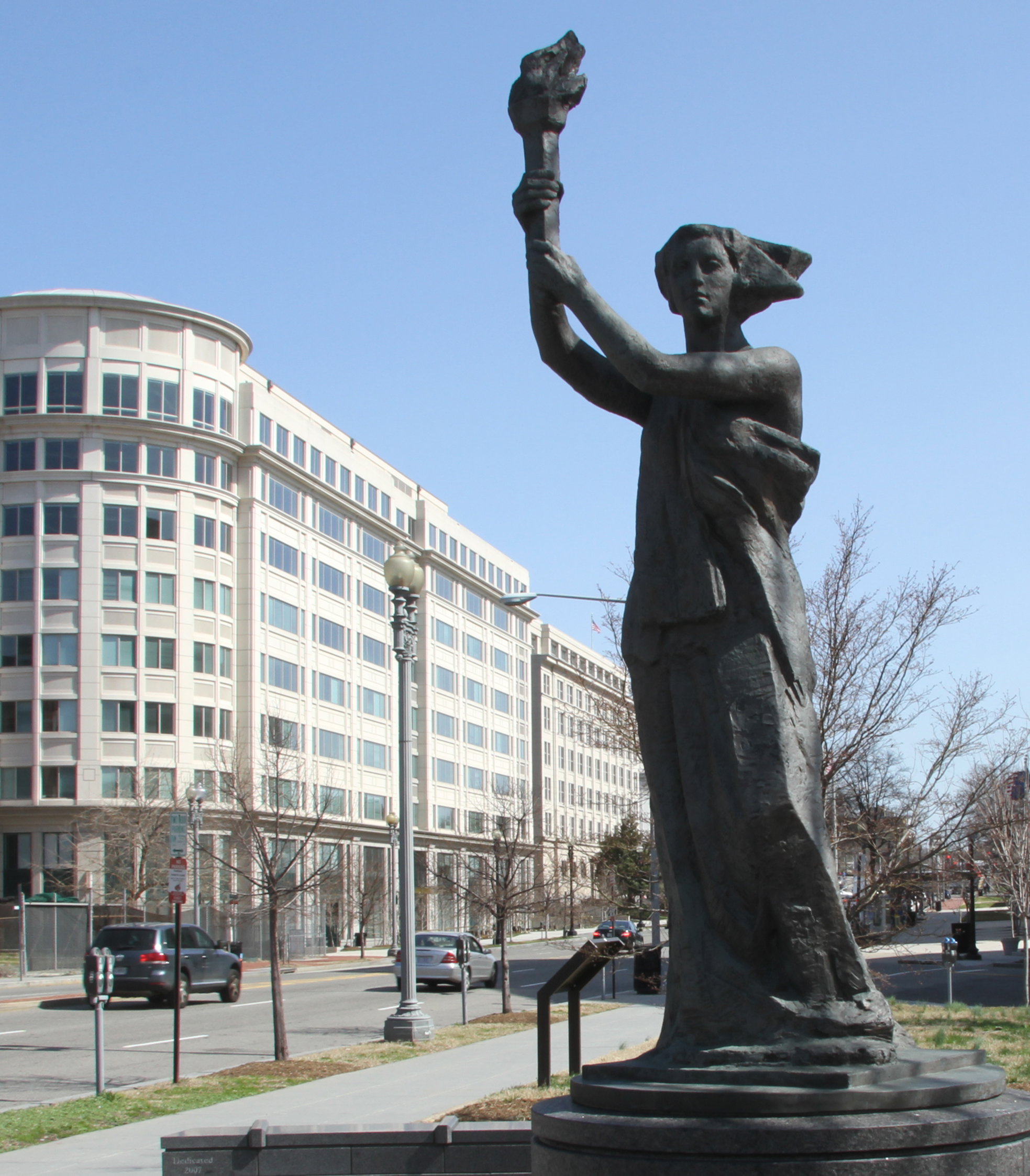
The "Victims of Communism Memorial" in Washington, DC.

Monuments to the victims of communist states exist in almost all the capitals of Eastern Europe and there are several museums documenting communist rule such as the Museum of Occupations and Freedom Fights in Lithuania, the Museum of the Occupation of Latvia in Riga, and the House of Terror in Budapest, all three of which also document Nazi rule. In Washington D.C., a bronze statue based upon the 1989 Tiananmen Square Goddess of Democracy sculpture was dedicated as the Victims of Communism Memorial in 2007, having been authorized by the United States Congress in 1993. The Victims of Communism Memorial Foundation plans to build an International Museum on Communism in Washington. As of 2008, Russia contained 627 memorials and memorial plaques dedicated to victims of the communist states, most of which were created by private citizens and did not have a national monument or a national museum. The Wall of Grief in Moscow, inaugurated in October 2017, is Russia's first monument for victims of political persecution by Stalin during the country's Soviet era. In 2017, Canada's National Capital Commission approved the design for a memorial to the victims of communism to be built at the Garden of the Provinces and Territories in Ottawa. On 23 August 2018, Estonia's Victims of Communism 1940–1991 Memorial was inaugurated in Tallinn by President Kersti Kaljulaid. The memorial construction was financed by the state and is managed by the Estonian Institute of Historical Memory. The opening ceremony was chosen to coincide with the official European Day of Remembrance for Victims of Stalinism and Nazism. The Czech Republic enshrines in its 1992 constitution a prison sentence for anyone who "denies, doubts, approves or even tries to justify the communist genocide, as well as the Nazi genocide".

According to anthropologist Kristen Ghodsee, efforts to institutionalize the victims of communism narrative, or the moral equivalence between the Nazi Holocaust (race murder) and the victims of communism (class murder), and in particular the push during the 2008 financial crisis for commemoration of the latter in Europe, can be seen as the response by economic and political elites to fears of a leftist resurgence in the face of devastated economies and extreme inequalities in both the East and West as the result of the excesses of neoliberal capitalism. Ghodsee argues that any discussion of the achievements under communist states, including literacy, education, women's rights, and social security is usually silenced, and any discourse on the subject of communism is focused almost exclusively on Stalin's crimes and the double genocide theory. According to Laure Neumayer, this is used as an anti-communist narrative "based on a series of categories and figures" to "denounce Communist state violence (qualified as 'Communist crimes', 'red genocide' or 'classicide') and to honour persecuted individuals (presented alternatively as 'victims of Communism' and 'heroes of anti totalitarian resistance')."

== Related crimes ==
During the mass killings, in addition to the people who were killed, many other people were victimized but did not die. The crimes which were committed against them have been described as crimes against humanity. For instance, the 2008 Prague Declaration on European Conscience and Communism stated that crimes which were committed in the name of communism should be assessed as crimes against humanity. The government of Cambodia has prosecuted former members of the Khmer Rouge, and the governments of Estonia, Latvia and Lithuania have passed laws that have led to the prosecution of several perpetrators for their crimes against the Baltic peoples. They were tried for crimes which they committed during the occupation of the Baltic states in 1940 and 1941 as well as for crimes which they committed during the Soviet reoccupation of those states which occurred after World War II.

=== Soviet Union ===
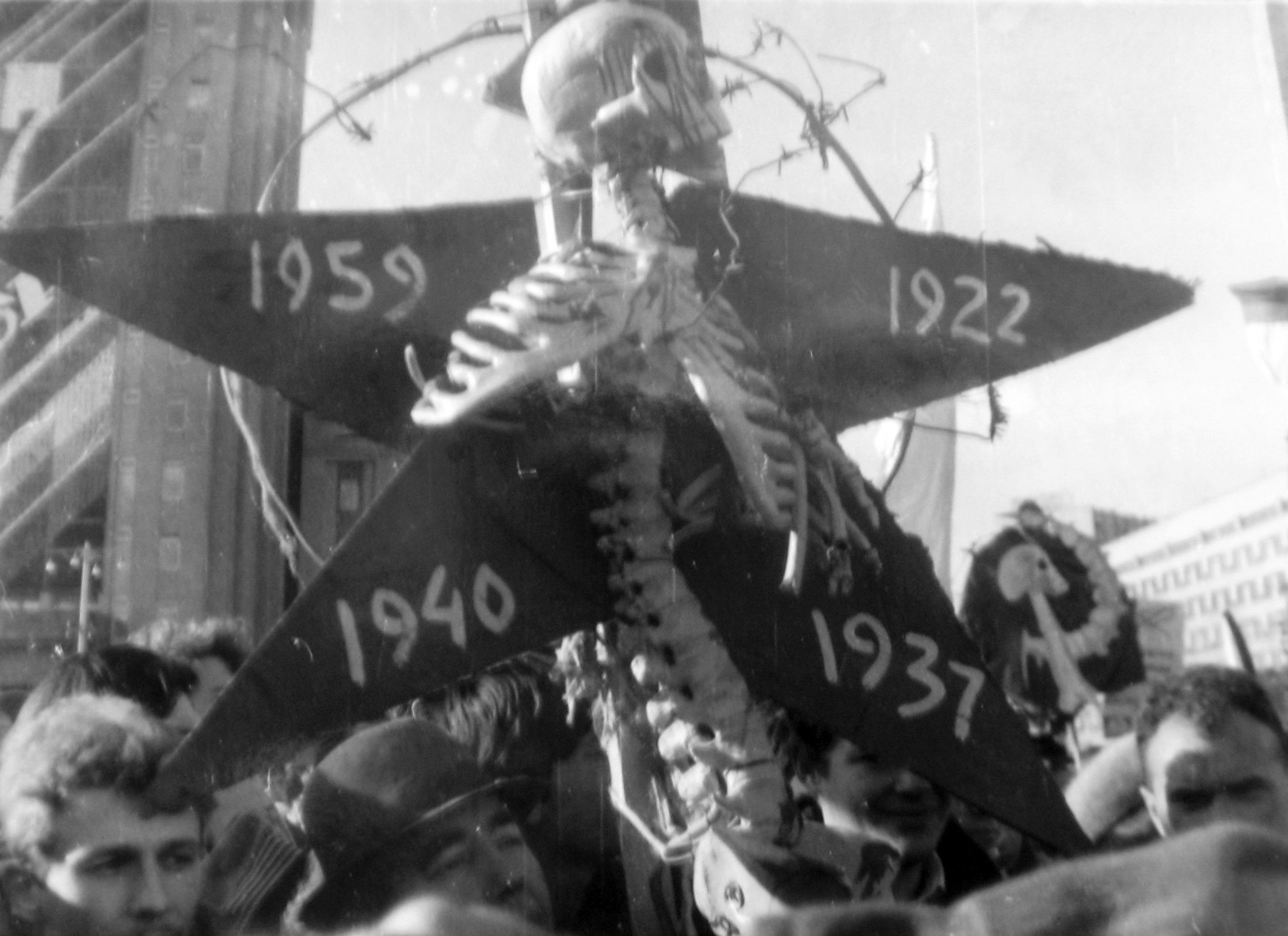
A demonstration in Minsk in 1990, commemorating the bloodiest purges in the history of the Soviet Union

Some scholars (such as Robert Conquest, Norman Naimark, Timothy Snyder and Michael Ellman) consider the Holodomor, a famine in Soviet Ukraine from 1932 to 1933 that killed millions of Ukrainians, as an act of genocide or a crime against humanity, although others, such as R. W. Davies and Stephen G. Wheatcroft, argue that the famine was man-made but unintentional. Stalin's "Great Purge" of 1937 is often considered a crime against humanity, with deaths of 700,000 to 1.2 million.

The war crimes which were perpetrated by the Soviet Union's armed forces from 1919 to 1991 include acts which were committed by the Red Army (later called the Soviet Army) as well as acts which were committed by the country's secret police, NKVD, including its Internal Troops. In many cases, these acts were committed upon the orders of the Soviet leaders Vladimir Lenin and Joseph Stalin in pursuance of the early Soviet government's policy of Red Terror. In other instances they were committed without orders by Soviet troops against prisoners of war or civilians of countries that had been in armed conflict with the USSR, or they were committed during partisan warfare.

A significant number of these incidents occurred in Northern, Central, and Eastern Europe recently before, and during, the aftermath of World War II, involving summary executions and the mass murder of prisoners of war, such as in the Katyn massacre and mass rape by troops of the Red Army in territories they occupied.

When the Allies of World War II founded the post-war International Military Tribunal to examine war crimes committed during the conflict by Nazi Germany, with officials from the Soviet Union taking an active part in the judicial processes, there was no examination of the Allied forces' actions and no charges were ever brought against their troops, because they were undefeated powers which then held Europe under military occupation, marring the historical authority of the Tribunal's activity as being, in part, victor's justice.

In the 1990s and 2000s, war crimes trials held in the Baltic states led to the prosecution of some Russians and Ukrainians, mostly in absentia, and some Latvians, Lithuanians and Estonians, for crimes against humanity committed during or shortly after World War II, including killings or deportations of civilians. In April 2022, following Russia’s invasion of Ukraine in February 2022, an amendment was adopted in Russia to the law "On Perpetuating the Victory of the Soviet People in the Great Patriotic War of 1941–1945." This amendment prohibits "publicly equating the goals, decisions, and actions of the leadership, command, and military personnel of the USSR with the goals, decisions, and actions of representatives of the Third Reich." These restrictions apply to public statements as well as texts published in the media or on the internet. Penalties for violations include a fine ranging from 1,000 to 2,000 rubles or administrative detention for up to 15 days (Article 13.48 of the Code of Administrative Offenses of the Russian Federation).

=== China ===
Mao Zedong was the chairman of the Chinese Communist Party (CCP) which took control of China in 1949 until his death in September 1976. During his rule, he instituted several reform efforts, the most notable of them were the Great Leap Forward and the Cultural Revolution. In January 1958, Mao launched the second five-year plan, which was known as the Great Leap Forward. The purpose of the plan was to use heavy industry to expedite the production of raw materials such as steel as a supplement to economic growth, similar to the Soviet model and the defining factor behind Mao's Chinese Marxist policies. Mao spent ten months touring the country in 1958 to gain support for the Great Leap Forward and inspect the progress that had already been made. What this entailed was the humiliation, public castigation and torture of all who questioned the leap. The five-year-plan first instituted the division of farming communities into communes. The Chinese National Program for Agricultural Development (NPAD) began to accelerate its drafting plans for the countries industrial and agricultural outputs. The drafting plans were initially successful as the Great Leap Forward divided the Chinese workforce and production briefly soared.

Eventually, CCP planners developed even more ambitious goals such as replacing the draft plans for 1962 with those for 1967 and the industries developed supply bottlenecks, but they could not meet the growth demands. Rapid industrial development came in turn with a swelling of urban populations. Due to the furthering of collectivization, heavy industry production and the stagnation of the farming industry that did not keep up with the demands of population growth in combination with a year (1959) of unfortunate weather in farming areas, only 170 million tons of grain were produced, far below the actual amount of grain which the population needed. Mass starvation ensued and it was made even worse in 1960, when only 144 million tons of grain were produced, a total amount which was 26 million tons lower than the total amount of grain that was produced in 1959. The government instituted rationing, but between 1958 and 1962 it is estimated that at least 10 million people died of starvation. The famine did not go unnoticed and Mao was fully aware of the major famine that was sweeping the countryside, but rather than try to fix the problem he blamed it on counterrevolutionaries who were "hiding and dividing grain". Mao even symbolically decided to abstain from eating meat in honor of those who were suffering.

An original estimate of the final death toll ranged from 15 to 40 million. According to Frank Dikötter, a chair professor of humanities at the University of Hong Kong and the author of Mao's Great Famine, a book which details the Great Chinese Famine and the consequences of the Great Leap Forward, the total number of people who were killed in the famine which lasted from 1958 to 1962 ran upwards of 45 million. Of those who were killed in the famine, 6–8% of them were often tortured first and then prematurely killed by the government, 2% of them committed suicide and 5% of them died in Mao's labor camps which were built to hold those who were labelled "enemies of the people". In an article for The New York Times, Dikötter also references severe punishments for slight infractions such as being buried alive for stealing a handful of grain or losing an ear and being branded for digging up a potato. Dikötter claims that a chairman in an executive meeting in 1959 expressed apathy with regard to the widespread suffering, stating: "When there is not enough to eat, people starve to death. It is better to let half of the people die so that the other half can eat their fill". Anthony Garnaut clarifies that Dikötter's interpretation of Mao's quotation, "It is better to let half of the people die so that the other half can eat their fill." not only ignores the substantial commentary on the conference by other scholars and several of its key participants, but defies the very plain wording of the archival document in his possession on which he hangs his case.

=== Cambodia ===
There is a scholarly consensus that the Cambodian genocide which was carried out by the Khmer Rouge under the leadership of Pol Pot in what became known as the Killing Fields was a crime against humanity. Over the course of 4 years, the Pol Pot regime was responsible for the deaths of approximately 2 million people through starvation, exhaustion, execution, lack of medical care as a result of the communist utopia experiment. Legal scholars Antoine Garapon and David Boyle, sociologist Michael Mann and professor of political science Jacques Sémelin all believe that the actions of the Communist Party of Kampuchea can best be described as a crime against humanity rather than a genocide. In 2018, the Khmer Rouge Tribunal found the Khmer Rouge guilty of committing genocide against the minority Muslim Cham and Vietnamese. Conviction appeal against court decision was rejected in 2022. It reaffirms the ECCC's recognition of the Khmer Rouge's racial discrimination and ethnic cleansing against non-Cambodian (Khmer) minorities. The naming of the Cambodian genocide is an overlooked problem because it downplays the overwhelming sufferings among targeted minority groups and the important roles of racism in understanding how the genocide was perpetrated. Historian Eric D. Weitz calls the Khmer Rouge's ethnic policy "racial communism."

In 1997 the co-prime ministers of Cambodia sought help from the United Nations in seeking justice for the crimes which were perpetrated by the communists during the years from 1975 to 1979. In June 1997, Pol Pot was taken prisoner during an internal power struggle within the Khmer Rouge and offered up to the international community. However, no country was willing to seek his extradition. The policies enacted by the Khmer Rouge led to the deaths of one quarter of the population in just four years.

=== Ethiopia ===
Following the overthrow of Ethiopian emperor Haile Selassie in 1974, the Derg gained control over Ethiopia and established a Marxist–Leninist state. They enacted the Red Terror against political opponents, killing an estimated 10,000 to 750,000 people. Derg chairman Mengistu Haile Mariam said "We are doing what Lenin did. You cannot build socialism without Red Terror." The Save the Children Fund reported that the victims of the Red Terror included not only adults but 1,000 or more children, mostly aged between eleven and thirteen, whose corpses were left in the streets of Addis Ababa.

On 13 August 2004, 33 top former Derg officials were presented in trial for genocide and other human rights violations during the Red Terror. The officials appealed for a pardon to the Prime Minister Meles Zenawi in a forum to "beg the Ethiopian public for their pardon for the mistakes done knowingly or unknowingly" during the Derg regime. No official response made by the government to the date. The Red Terror trial included grave human rights violations, comprising genocide, crime against humanity, torture, rape and forced disappearances which be would punishable under Article 7 of the Universal Declaration of Human Rights, article 26 of the International Covenant on Civil and Political Rights as well as article 3 of the African Charter on Human and People's Rights, all of which made part of the Ethiopian law.

=== North Korea ===
Three victims of the prison camp system in North Korea unsuccessfully attempted to bring Kim Jong-il to justice with the aid of the Citizens Coalition for Human Rights of abductees and North Korean Refugees. In December 2010, they filed charges in The Hague. The NGO group Christian Solidarity Worldwide has stated that the gulag system appears to be specifically designed to kill a large number of people who are labelled enemies or have a differing political belief.

=== Romania ===
In a speech before the Parliament of Romania, President Traian Băsescu stated that "the criminal and illegitimate former communist regime committed massive human rights violations and crimes against humanity, killing and persecuting as many as two million people between 1945 and 1989". The speech was based on the 660-page report of a Presidential Commission headed by Vladimir Tismăneanu, a professor at the University of Maryland. The report also stated that "the regime exterminated people by assassination and deportation of hundreds of thousands of people" and it also highlighted the Pitești Experiment.

Engineer and former political prisoner Gheorghe Boldur-Lățescu has also stated that the Pitești Experiment was a crime against humanity, while Dennis Deletant has described it as "[a]n experiment of a grotesque originality ... [which] employed techniques of psychiatric abuse which were not only designed to inculcate terror into opponents of the regime but also to destroy the personality of the individual. The nature and enormity of the experiment ... set Romania apart from the other Eastern European regimes."

=== Yugoslavia ===
Dominic McGoldrick writes that as the head of a "highly centralized and oppressive" dictatorship, Josip Broz Tito wielded tremendous power in Yugoslavia, with his dictatorial rule administered through an elaborate bureaucracy which routinely suppressed human rights. First repressions included reprisal killings against World War II POWs, most prominent being Bleiburg repatriations and Foibe massacres. Near the end of the Second World War, Banat Swabians who were suspected to have been involved with the Nazi administration were placed into internment camps. Many were tortured, and at least 5,800 were killed. Others were subject to forced labor. In March 1945, the surviving Swabians were ghettoized in "village camps", later described as "extermination camps" by the survivors, where the death rate ranged as high as 50%. The most notorious camp was at Knićanin (formerly Rudolfsgnad), where an estimated 11,000 to 12,500 Swabians died.

Some 120,000 Macedonian Serbs were forced to emigrate to Serbia by the Yugoslav Communists after they had opted for Serbian citizenship in 1944. Those who stayed were subject to increasing Macedonian efforts, such as forcibly changing their surnames, substituting "ić" with "ski " (Jovanović - Jovanovski). In the whole period after the Second World War the Serbs in the Socialist Republic of Macedonia were kept from freely developing their national and cultural identity. The Serbs were treated like second-class citizens.

The Tito–Stalin split initiated a repression against known and alleged Stalinists, which included even some of the most prominent among Tito's collaborators, most of which were taken to a labor camp on Goli otok. On 19 November 1956, Milovan Đilas, perhaps the closest of Tito's collaborators and widely regarded as Tito's possible successor, was arrested and jailed for four years because of his criticism against certain actions of the Yugoslav regime. The repression did not exclude intellectuals and writers such as Venko Markovski, who was arrested and sent to jail in January 1956 for writing poems considered anti-Titoist.

Tito's Yugoslavia had been described as a tightly controlled police state. According to David Matas, outside the Soviet Union, Yugoslavia had more political prisoners than all of the rest of Eastern Europe combined. Tito's secret police was modeled on the Soviet KGB. Its members were ever-present and often acted extrajudicially, with victims including middle-class intellectuals, liberals and democrats. Yugoslavia was a signatory to the International Covenant on Civil and Political Rights, but scant regard was paid to some of its provisions.

== See also ==
- Bibliography of the Holodomor

Communist movements and violence

- Anti-communism
- Anti-communist mass killings
- Communist terrorism
- Criticism of communist states
- Far-left politics
- Left-wing politics
- Left-wing terrorism
- Red Terror (disambiguation)
- Repressive psychiatry in the Soviet Union
- The Black Book of Communism

Violence by governments in general and comparative studies

- Comparison of Nazism and Stalinism
- Genocide studies
  - Outline of genocide studies
- Holocaust studies
- Political violence
- Soviet and communist studies
