= Political cleansing =

Political cleansing may refer to:

- Party purge, cleansing of a party of perceived undesirables
- Political cleansing of population
- Decommunization
- Denazification
