= Extensive growth =

Extensive growth, in economics, is growth in the quantity of output produced based on the expansion of the quantity of inputs used. It contrasts with intensive growth, which arises from inputs being used more productively. For example, GDP growth caused only by increases in population or territory would be extensive growth. Thus, extensive growth is likely to be subject to diminishing returns. It is therefore often viewed as having no effect on per-capita magnitudes in the long-run.

Reliance on extensive growth can be undesirable in the long-run because it exhausts resources. To maintain economic growth in the long-run, especially on a per-capita basis, it is good for an economy to grow intensively—for example, by improvements in technology or organisation, thereby shifting the economy’s production possibilities frontier outward.

== See also ==
- Economic development
- Economic Protection (in German)
