= Alex J. Bellamy =

Political scientist

Alexander J. Bellamy (born 1975) is an academic who directs the Asia-Pacific Centre for the Responsibility to Protect (R2P) and is a professor in the department of peace and conflict studies at University of Queensland.

Bellamy's views on R2P have been criticized by Jeremy Moses, who writes that according to Bellamy's writings on the subject, "mass atrocities take place exclusively in authoritarian states, not in the confines of liberal democracies like the United States, United Kingdom, Australia, or, perhaps, even Israel", while Western powers can be faulted for failure to intervene but not perpetration or complicity in such atrocities. Moses writes that the Gaza genocide is proof that there is not "a massive gap between government by atrocity and liberal democracy" as Bellamy claims, but instead that democracies are capable of genocide.

== Works ==
- Bellamy, Alex J. (2006). Just Wars: From Cicero to Iraq. Wiley. ISBN 978-0-7456-3282-7.
- Bellamy, Alex J. (2009). Responsibility to Protect. Polity. ISBN 978-0-7456-4348-9.
- Bellamy, Alex J. (2010). Global Politics and the Responsibility to Protect: From Words to Deeds. Routledge. ISBN 978-1-136-86864-1.
- Bellamy, Alex J.; Williams, Paul D. (2011). "The new politics of protection? Côte d'Ivoire, Libya and the responsibility to protect". International Affairs. 87 (4): 825–850. doi:10.1111/j.1468-2346.2011.01006.x.
- Bellamy, Alex J. (2012). Massacres and Morality: Mass Atrocities in an Age of Civilian Immunity. Oxford University Press. ISBN 978-0-19-928842-7.
- Bellamy, Alex J. (2015). The Responsibility to Protect: A Defense. Oxford University Press. ISBN 978-0-19-870411-9.
- Bellamy, Alex J. (2017). East Asia's Other Miracle: Explaining the Decline of Mass Atrocities. Oxford University Press. ISBN 978-0-19-877793-9.
- Bellamy, Alex J. (2019). World Peace and How We Can Achieve It. Oxford University Press. ISBN 978-0-19-883352-9.
