= Barbara Harff =

German academic (born 1942)

Barbara Harff (born 17 July 1942) is professor of political science emerita at the U.S. Naval Academy in Annapolis, Maryland. In 2003 and again in 2005 she was a distinguished visiting professor at the Strassler Center for Holocaust and Genocide Studies at Clark University. Her research focuses on the causes, risks, and prevention of genocidal violence.

== Career ==
Born in Kassel, Germany, Harff's Ph.D. dissertation at Northwestern University in 1981 applied the international legal doctrine of humanitarian intervention to genocide. It was published in 1984 as a monograph on Genocide and Human Rights. Before joining the US Naval Academy faculty in 1989, Harff held academic positions in the Department of Legal Studies, La Trobe University, in Melbourne, Australia; and the University of Illinois Chicago campus; she retired from the Naval Academy in 2005.

In the early 1980s, Harff began to develop a dataset on cases of genocide and political mass murder since 1945 to demonstrate that genocidal killings were far more common than widely believed. She identified and profiled 46 instances through 1985. This list provided the basis for systematic comparative analysis by her and others.

Harff's list of cases included mass killings that targeted political groups such as the victims of China's Cultural Revolution (1966–75) and the Muslim Brotherhood in Syria (1981–82), for which she termed the word "politicide". The inclusion of these episodes along with genocidal killings targeting ethnic and religious groups has been largely but not entirely accepted by other scholars and by policy makers. However, mass killings of political groups remain outside the legal definition of genocide formulated in the UN Genocide Convention of 1948.

From 1995, Harff served as senior consultant to the White House-initiated State Failure (now Political Instability) Task Force whose data set on state failures included her cases of genocide and politicide. In her work for the Task Force she designed data-based analyses of the preconditions and accelerators of genocidal killings for use by the Clinton and Bush Administrations. Her risk assessment model for genocide and its application to contemporary conflict situations was published in 2003.

She also developed an early warning model to identify local, national, and international events that help turn high-risk situations into full-fledged genocidal killings. She applied this model, which identified some 70 categories of actions, to information on events that preceded mass atrocities in Bosnia, Rwanda, Burundi, and the Democratic Republic of Congo.

Harff was one of the academic planners for the Swedish Foreign Ministry's 2004 Stockholm International Forum on the Prevention of Genocide, in which delegations from more than 50 states participated. In a followup to the forum she worked with Yehuda Bauer and others to establish the international Genocide Prevention Advisory Network. Since 2004 she has been asked to advise on genocide risks and prevention to the office of the UN Special Advisor on the Prevention of Genocide and to government agencies in Switzerland, Sweden, and the Netherlands.

In 2012, Harff accepted an offer to be a lecturer and visiting scholar at the University of Nevada, Las Vegas. In 2013 she was awarded the Raphael Lemkin Prize by the Auschwitz Institute for Peace and Reconciliation. The award was presented by the Auschwitz Institute's president, Fred Schwartz, at a conference at the Benjamin N. Cardozo School of Law.

== Publications and honors ==
Other publications include Ethnic Conflict in World Politics and Essays in Honor of Helen Fein (2007), coedited with Joyce Apsel and published by the International Association of Genocide Scholars. She also has written some sixty articles and chapters on the international and comparative dimensions of massive human rights violations. She has held visiting appointments as PIOOM Fellow at the Center for the Study of Social Conflicts, University of Leiden (1993), and Uppsala University's Department of Peace and Conflict Research (1996–97).
