= Clark McCauley =

American social psychologist (born 1943)

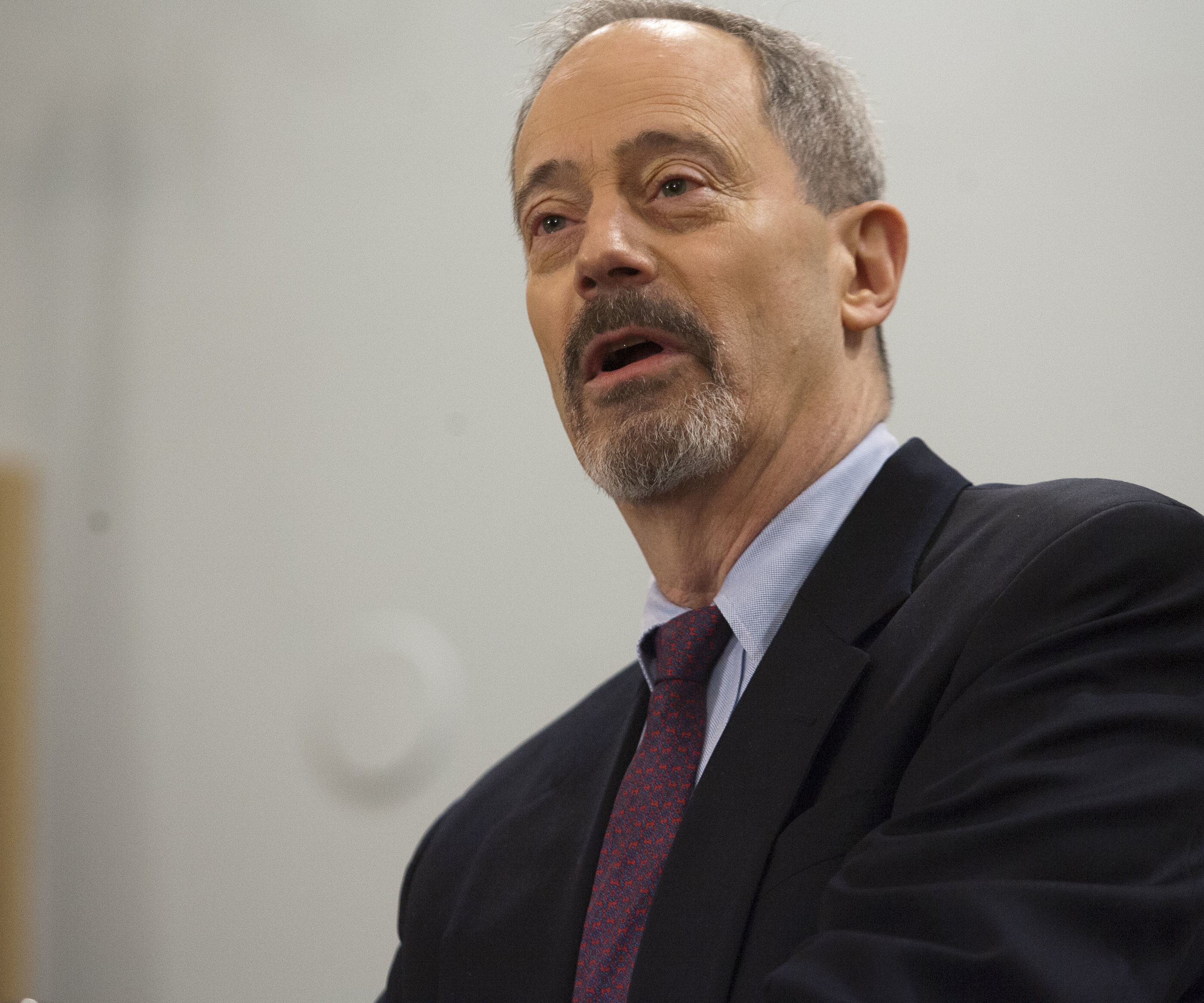
Clark Richard McCauley

Clark Richard McCauley (born 1943) is an American social psychologist who is Research Professor of Psychology and co-director of the Solomon Asch Center for Study of Ethnopolitical Conflict at Bryn Mawr College.

== Education and career ==
McCauley received his Bachelor of Science degree in biology from Providence College in 1965, his Master of Arts degree in psychology from the University of Pennsylvania in 1967, and his Ph.D. in social psychology from the University of Pennsylvania in 1970. He has been a faculty member at Bryn Mawr College since 1970: assistant professor (1970–1976), associate professor (1976–1986), professor (1986–2016), and research professor (2016–present).

He was a member of the Psychosocial Working Group and the American Psychological Association's Task Force on Reaction to Terrorism. He has been a consultant/reviewer for the Harry Frank Guggenheim Foundation.

McCauley's research interests include the psychology of group identification, group dynamics and intergroup conflict, and the psychological foundations of ethnic conflict and genocide. He is founding editor of the journal Dynamics of Asymmetric Conflict: Pathways toward Terrorism and Genocide.

== Books ==
- De Gruyter Handbook of the Psychology of Terrorism. Berlin: De Gruyter, 2026 (co-editor with Sophia Moskalenko and Gina Ligon).
- Radicalization to Terrorism: What Everyone Needs to Know. New York: Oxford University Press, 2020 (co-author with Sophia Moskalenko).
- The Marvel of Martyrdom: The Power of Self-Sacrifice in a Selfish World. New York: Oxford University Press, 2019 (co-author with Sophia Moskalenko).
- Friction: How Conflict Radicalizes Them and Us. New York: Oxford University Press, revised and expanded second edition, 2017 (co-author with Sophia Moskalenko).
- Why Not Kill Them All? The Logic and Prevention of Mass Political Murder. Princeton, NJ: Princeton University Press, 2006 (co-author with Daniel Chirot).
- The Psychology of Ethnic and Cultural Conflict. Westport, CT: Praeger, 2004 (co-editor).
- Personality and Person Perception across Cultures. Mahwah, NJ: Erlbaum, 1999 (co-editor).
- Stereotype Accuracy: Toward an Appreciation of Group Differences. Washington, DC: APA Books, 1995 (co-editor).
- Terrorism Research and Public Policy. London: Frank Cass, 1991 (editor).
- Frontiers of Behavior. NY: Praeger, 1976 (co-editor).
