= Klas-Göran Karlsson =

Swedish historian

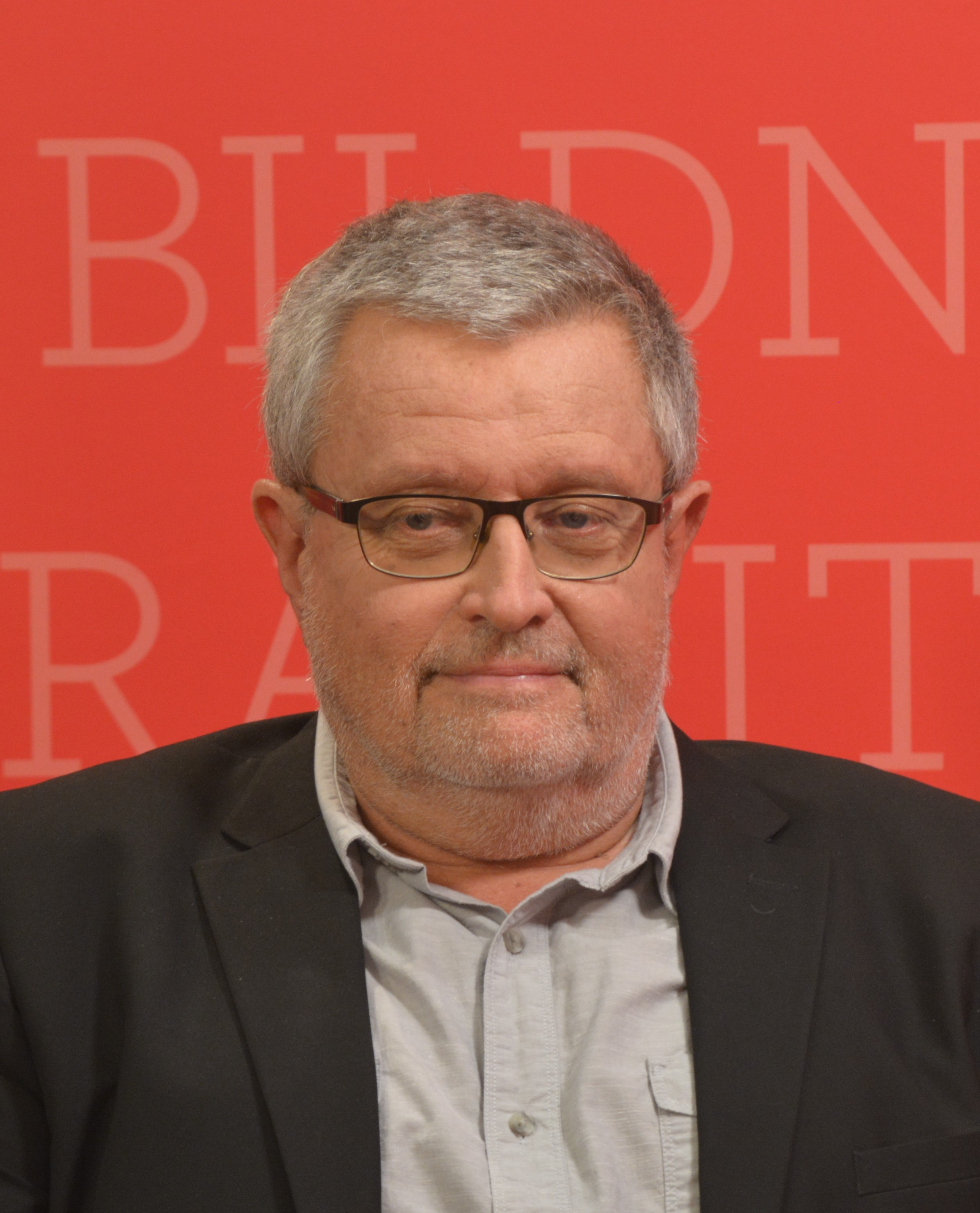
Klas-Göran Karlsson

Klas-Göran Karlsson (born 1955) is a professor of history at Lund University. Karlsson is an author of books on conflictology and Holocaust studies such as "The Holocaust as a Problem of Historical Culture". One of the focus areas of Karlsson's research is the topic of genocide.

In Crimes Against Humanity under Communist Regimes, Karlsson prefers using the term crimes against humanity to include "the direct mass killings of politically undesirable elements, as well as forced deportations and forced labour." Karlsson acknowledges that the term may be misleading in the sense that the Communist regimes targeted groups of their own citizens, but he considers it useful as a broad legal term which emphasizes attacks on civilian populations and because the offenses demean humanity as a whole.

In 2019, Karlsson published The Modern Thirty-Year War (Det moderna trettioåriga kriget – Europa 1914–1945). The book's comparative perspective with developments outside Europe was praised by reviewers.

== Works in English ==
Only some of Karlsson's 40 books have been written in, or translated into, English. Among them are:

- Lessons at the limits, in Remembering the Holocaust in Educational Settings; Routledge, 2018.
- Holocaust heritage: inquiries into European historical cultures; with Ulf Zander; Sekel, 2004.
- Perspectives on the Entangled History of Communism and Nazism: A Comnaz Analysis; with Johan Stenfeldt and Ulf Zander; Lexington Books (Rowman & Littlefield), 2015
- Crimes Against Humanity under Communist Regimes; Forum for Living History, 2008
