= Eric D. Weitz =

American historian (1953–2021)

FBA, FRHistS Eric D. Weitz
- Born: June 15, 1953; New York City, U.S.
- Died: July 1, 2021 (aged 68); Princeton, New Jersey, U.S.
- Occupation: Professor of History
- Spouse: Brigitta van Rheinberg (m. 2011–2021)
- Children: 2

Academic background
- Education: Binghamton University (BA); Boston University (MA, PhD)

Academic work
- Discipline: History
- Institutions: St. Olaf College; University of Minnesota; City College of New York
- Main interests: History of the Weimar Republic, genocide studies, civil rights

Eric David Weitz (June 15, 1953 – July 1, 2021) was a professor of history at City University of New York, and the author of several books.

== Education ==
Of Jewish origin, he studied at Boston University for his MA, and received his PhD supervised by Norman Naimark. His dissertation was "Conflict in the Ruhr: Workers and Socialist Politics in Essen, 1910–1925".

== Themes of research and writing ==
Weitz specialized in German history, Soviet history, and genocide studies.

According to historian Sarah K. Danielsson, Weitz's historical "work on genocide had always grappled with the root causes of mass violence and extermination, and it led him to look at the history of human rights."

He edited "Human Rights and Crimes against Humanity” at Princeton University Press.

== Political views ==
Eric Weitz joined a number of scholars in condemning Donald Trump in 2016. He compared Donald Trump's right-wing populism to the political atmosphere in the Weimar Republic. Weitz criticized what he saw as increasing political polarization.

== Works ==
- Weitz, Eric D. (1997). Creating German Communism, 1890-1990: From Popular Protests to Socialist State. Princeton University Press. ISBN 978-0-691-02682-4.
- Weitz, Eric D. (2002). "Racial Politics without the Concept of Race: Reevaluating Soviet Ethnic and National Purges". Slavic Review. 61 (1): 1–29. doi:10.2307/2696978. ISSN 0037-6779. JSTOR 2696978. S2CID 156279881.
- Weitz, Eric D. (2008-12-01). "From the Vienna to the Paris System: International Politics and the Entangled Histories of Human Rights, Forced Deportations, and Civilizing Missions". The American Historical Review. 113 (5): 1313–1343. doi:10.1086/ahr.113.5.1313. eISSN 1937-5239.
- Weitz, Eric D. (2015) [2003]. A Century of Genocide: Utopias of Race and Nation. Princeton University Press. ISBN 978-0-691-16587-5.
- Weitz, Eric D. (2018) [2007]. Weimar Germany: Promise and Tragedy. Princeton University Press. ISBN 978-0-691-18305-3.
- Weitz, Eric D. (2019). A World Divided: The Global Struggle for Human Rights in the Age of Nation-States. Princeton University Press. ISBN 978-0-691-18555-2.
