= Martin Malia =

American historian (1924–2004)

Martin Edward Malia (March 14, 1924 – November 19, 2004, Oakland, California) was an American historian specializing in Russian history. He taught at the University of California at Berkeley from 1958 to 1991.

Malia was born in Springfield, Massachusetts and was a Roman Catholic. He earned degrees from Yale University (BA) and Harvard University (PhD).

Malia's best known work is his history of Russian communism, The Soviet Tragedy (1994). In it he challenges the traditional Leftist interpretation of communism as a fundamentally sound project, that admittedly went wrong during Stalin's regime, but in later years succeeded in creating a credible alternative to capitalism. Malia posits that the integral socialism proclaimed by Lenin, then soft-pedaled under the New Economic Policy, resumed by Stalin and pursued by all his successors until Gorbachev, was basically flawed, precisely because it destructed capitalism integrally. The untrammeled socialist project was from the start an uphill battle, which brought about not only the destruction of economic freedom but of almost any freedom. The Soviet system could therefore not tap the reservoir of human potential that its ideology promised to bring to new heights.

Malia also wrote a famous essay "To the Stalin Mausoleum" (1990) which he signed as Z. The essay was reprinted in Eastern Europe...Central Europe...Europe which was edited by Stephen R. Graubard. He is the author of the foreword to the English version of The Black Book of Communism.

His book History's Locomotives. Revolution and the making of the Modern World (2006) is an example of historiographic reflection. In the eighth chapter Malia gives a survey of debates about the French Revolution from the 19th century up to our time.

One of his colleagues at Berkeley was another prominent Russian historian, Nicholas V. Riasanovsky. In the official Berkeley obituary, Riasanovsky is quoted as saying of Malia that he was an "outstanding and now very popular historian, occupying a leading position in the present international discussion of the collapse of the Soviet Union and what that collapse means historically and for the future. (He also was) a brilliant writer in Russian and European intellectual history."

== Publications ==
- Alexander Herzen and the Birth of Russian Socialism, 1812–1855 (1961)
- The Soviet Tragedy: A History of Socialism in Russia, 1917–1991 (1994)
- Russia under Western Eyes: From the Bronze Horseman to the Lenin Mausoleum (Cambridge, Massachusetts, and London: Belknap Press of Harvard University Press, 1999)
- History's Locomotives. Revolution and the making of the Modern World (2006)

== Bibliography ==
- Daly, Jonathan, “The Pleiade: Five Scholars Who Founded Russian Historical Studies in America,” Kritika: Explorations in Russian and Eurasian History 18, no. 4 (Fall 2017): 785–826.
- Graubard, Steven R. Eastern Europe...Central Europe...Europe...USA: Westview Press, Inc. 1991 ISBN 0-8133-8150-9
