= Population cleansing =

Population cleansing is the deliberate removal of a population with certain undesirable characteristics, such as its ethnicity (ethnic cleansing), its religion (religious cleansing), its social group (social cleansing), its social class, its ideological or political criteria (political cleansing), etc. from certain territories.

Throughout antiquity, population cleansing was largely motivated by economic and political factors, although ethnic factors occasionally played a role. Andrew Bell-Fialkoff attributes the earliest known example of cleansing as a state policy to Assyria. Assurnasirpal II and Assurbanipal resettled millions of people from the conquered territories in order to crush the resistance. Usually upper classes were resettled, rather than complete populations, because peasant and artisan masses usually lacked leadership to initiate revolts. He further gives a number of other cases in Chapter 1 "Cleansing: A Historical Overview" of his book. While discussing the case of Ancient Greece, Bell-Fialkoff singles out a special type of the elimination of a conquered polis, for which the Greeks had a special term: andrapodismos (from the word ἀνδράποδον, one taken in war and sold as a slave). Andrapodismos involved the destruction of a polis, killing all male adults and selling women and children into slavery. Other kinds of the elimination of a polis (with or without its destruction) involved removal of its whole population to another polis, dispersing over villages, or emigration of its population, possibly founding a polis elsewhere.

Since ancient times, methods of cleansing varied from killing (democide, genocide) to forced population transfer, to forced emigration.

== See also ==
- Demographic engineering
- Blockbusting
- Circassian genocide
- Classicide
- Communal violence
- Cultural conflict
- Cultural genocide
- Cultural rights
- Crimes against humanity
- Dahiya doctrine
- Democide
- Domicide
- Ethnic cleansing
- Ethnic conflict
- Ethnic hatred
- Ethnic nationalism
- Ethnic violence
- Ethnocide
- Extrajudicial killing
- Extrajudicial punishment
- Forced displacement
- Genocide
- Genocidal massacre
- Hate crime
- Hate group
- List of ethnic cleansing campaigns
- Lynching
- Monoethnicity
- Nakba
- Pogrom
- Political cleansing of population
- Political violence
- Politicide
- Population transfer
- Sectarian violence
- Social cleansing
- Redlining
- Religious cleansing
- Religious violence
- Terrorism
- The Holocaust
- Vigilantism
- War crime
