= Social cleansing =

Widespread killing based on perceived social status

Social cleansing (Spanish: limpieza social) is social group-based killing that consists of the elimination of members of society who are considered undesirable, including, but not limited to, the homeless, criminals, street children, the elderly, the poor, the weak, the sick, the needy and disabled people. This phenomenon is caused by a combination of economic and social factors, but killings are notably present in regions with high levels of poverty and disparities of wealth. Perpetrators are usually of the same community as the victims and they are often motivated by the idea that the victims are a drain on the resources of society. Efforts by national and local governments to stop these killings have been largely ineffective. The government and police forces are often involved in the killings, especially in Africa, Asia, and South America.

== Causes ==
=== Africa ===
In African countries, social cleansing almost always takes the form of witch hunting which is most common in areas with poor economic circumstances. Several social and economic theories exist as to why such circumstances have arisen and led to accusations of witchcraft, including warfare, natural disasters, unequal patterns of development, and larger forces of globalization. Most scholars agree that the cause of social cleansing efforts is a result of "interaction of economic conditions and cultural factors". All of these theories must be linked to larger societal trends, including the devaluation and social marginalization of women as well as the placement of blame on individuals for their own economic misfortunes in lieu of recognition of global and local economic forces at play. However, several scholars have emphasized the outside groups and circumstances related to these killings to dispute the idea that they are simply a cultural norm.

==== Economic ====
In many countries, income disparities have led to social tensions and a climate of "mutual suspicion". The wealthy and powerful are perceived as having obtained their wealth through "evil arts", while the economically disadvantaged are accused of responsibility for misfortunes of the community. There is also evidence that the causes of social cleansing are linked to globalization and economic liberalization, "to the extent that it has stripped entire populations of their means of subsistence, torn communities apart, deepened economic inequalities and forced people to compete for diminishing resources." Many African communities have been destabilized as communal lands have been privatized, local currency has been devalued, and public services have been eliminated. Sometimes these larger economic trends have been linked to more specific events. For example, in Southern Zimbabwe, violent wars led certain areas to be neglected in development efforts, leading to a lack of resources and increasing disparities of wealth in these areas. In Tanzania, scholars have found positive correlations between extreme rainfall (both floods and droughts) and large negative income shocks and famine. These periods have been statistically linked to increases in murder of witches.

==== Cultural ====
Several cultural explanations for social cleansing in Africa are related to religion. One that has been offered by scholars is the presence of Pentecostals, whose focus on the occult has been spread by the media and increased social anxiety. Pentecostals have been recorded as preaching connections between illness and the devil, which has combined potently with existing indigenous beliefs, most notably in Kenya, Ghana, Nigeria, and Tanzania. In Tanzania, a positive correlation exists between witch killing and areas where populations practice traditional religions, where the belief in witchcraft is strong. While scholars have suggested that the presence of these beliefs is important because it demonstrates the fact that perpetrators generally do believe that their victims are practicing witchcraft, they also recognize the fact that populations with traditional religious beliefs often have a low socio-economic status, which supports their assertion that poverty is still the primary factor in motivating killings.

=== Latin America ===
The most widespread myth about social cleansing in Latin America is that these killings are all related to drug use. However, the phenomenon is larger than the drug problem and is related to state ideology, a culture of violence, and inequitable wealth distribution. Within Colombia specifically, economic factors account for many of the reasons behind these killings, but such factors are additionally "aggravated by external political and economic pressures from the United States".

==== Economic ====
Latin America has an extremely large number of individuals living below the poverty line, and these individuals are largely blamed for their impoverished state. Many of these individuals are in critical poverty, meaning that they do not even have the ability to secure food and shelter. This critical poverty is connected to inflation rates that has led the cost of living to increase and the minimum salary to be hardly adequate for survival. Since the 1990s, the gap between the rich and poor has widened, and funds for welfare programs and social services has decreased while funding for security forces to protect "the haves from the have-nots" have tripled in Colombia specifically.

==== Culture of violence ====
Latin America's history has long been plagued by political violence, which over time has morphed into class-based violence. Despite mostly formally democratic governments, the "legacy of authoritarianism" lingers, and the presence of "armed actors" is prevalent as a result of a long history of violence between military, paramilitary, and guerrilla groups. The presence of the culture of violence has had various effects on the underclass in countries in Latin America. The military and especially the police have been known to use violence to harm citizens, rather than protect them.

Private "vigilante" security forces have likewise used violence against the poor with the idea of promoting law and order, especially in Colombia, Guatemala, and Peru. Though many guerilla groups are much less violent than when they originally emerged, they are a presence and an additional source of violence, especially in Colombia. Tension between political groups has led these guerilla groups, the government, and vigilante actors to suspect peasants of working with their enemy and to intimidate them into leaving land in the countryside for the city. Other poor rural residents have been forced to leave because of general violence or lack of public services. Violence at the local level is also extremely common by organized criminals such as street gangs, drug bosses, vigilante justice groups, and local civil patrols.

When poor residents are forced to move to the city, they often must turn to prostitution, crime, or begging in inner-city ghettos, which puts them in an extremely vulnerable position in the presence of these violent groups. Men in particular become even more entrenched in the culture of violence as many join gangs to escape "social exclusion and economic disadvantage" and establish a sense of identity and masculinity. Finally, violence exists at a level even smaller than the community: the home. Children are often victims of "physical, mental, and sexual abuse by adult members of their own families". In Guatemala specifically, social cleansing occurs with the "backdrop of genocide," and homicide rates are still extremely high after "three decades of armed conflict" during the Guatemalan Civil War.

Violence experienced across the region has led to an erosion of social capital, which was described by Colombians as including "'social mistrust,' 'lack of unity,' 'fear' and 'lack of social institutions.'"

== In Brazil ==
=== Victims and methods ===
The most common murder victim in Brazil is a young, black male living in a favela, or a Brazilian slum. These young men typically are, or are assumed to be, gang members and criminals. Violence and murder are most common in areas that are economically disadvantaged and socially marginalized. Women are often targets by association, though the effects of social cleansing and violence against women are largely absent in existing research. Killings are often in public places, with victims being beaten or shot in the street. Police groups sometimes simply enter the community in a large armoured vehicle called a "caveirão" and start shooting. This vehicle contributes to the "anonymity and impunity for the perpetrators".

=== Perpetrators and motivations ===
Social cleansing in Brazil is the result of a "murky symbiosis [that] has developed between the official security forces and paramilitary and vigilante-type actors" that carry out "law enforcement against the 'marginal classes.'" State actors often act against the poor "as a form or result of exclusion and oppression". Gangs serve as a scapegoat for the levels of violence and lack of security in many communities. Private groups and some gangs perpetrate killings in attempts to take policing into their own hands. While some killings are a result of groups attempting to punish criminals for misdemeanors, others are a result of perceived threats of poor citizens, such as members of workers' movements.

== In Colombia ==
In the 1980s, "social cleansing" groups started to be created. Their main mission was "to make justice" by killing all non-appropriate people in social terms, like prostitutes, street-living people, trans people, and drug addicts.

=== Victims and methods ===
Victims of social cleansing in Colombia are members of society who are considered "undesirable" and "disposable". They are economically disadvantaged, usually live on the streets, and are considered to be a burden on society, "the cause of the country's problems, rather than a consequence of them".

==== Street children ====
One of these groups is street children, who are without homes due to abuse, forced displacement, or the death of their parents. Death rates for street children have been as high as six to eight children per day. Children are often shot in their sleep or stabbed to death on the streets or in the police station. A 1993 case in which a nine-year-old girl was strangled to death in Bogota brought attention to this problem and led to nominal reforms. The National Police targets street children specifically under the assumption that they are drug users and criminals. This is to some extent true, as many use drugs to relieve pain and avoid hunger and must shoplift to survive. Despite living in conditions of extreme vulnerability to "aggression and danger", the National Police poses the greatest threat to street children's survival, as they drive them off the streets and target them in social cleansing.

==== Poor criminals, drug users, and drug dealers ====
Poor criminals, drug users, and drug dealers are also common targets. From 1988 to 1993, these individuals collectively comprised 56% of social cleansing victims. These individuals are often victims of physical and sexual abuse by the police and vigilante groups known as "comas". One common method of killing these individuals in the city of Bogota is the Choachí run, in which victims are taken to the top of a mountain in the town of Choachí, executed, and thrown off the mountain. In some cases, they are released to attempt escape, but die by falling down the mountain or being shot at as they run. A similar method is known as "the ride", in which victims are forced into a vehicle, killed, and left in a desolate area. Death squads have employed other means for killing suspected criminals, such as murdering them, then cutting off their hands and putting them in small boxes in public spaces to intimidate other criminals. Another group has been known to shoot victims and then cast their bodies into the municipal stadium.

==== Sex workers and sexual minorities ====
Sex workers and sexual minorities are treated quite similarly in regards to social cleansing, as both are hard to identify and victims of heavy discrimination despite the fact that both homosexuality and prostitution are legal. Many female sex workers are forced into the line of work due to poverty and domestic violence. Both male and female sex workers are often harassed by the police, and males specifically are demanded to pay a "tax" where "failure to pay results in beatings or imprisonment". In an upside-down system, encounters with dishonest police are preferable to honest police, as the dishonest will accept bribes, while the honest are more likely to kill. Sexual minorities are particularly difficult to identify, because not only do some male sex workers participate in gay sex out of economic necessity, but victims are only considered homosexual if they were dressed as females at the time of death.

==== Rapists and Sex Offenders ====
There is a vigilante group called the Los Calvos whose death squad started out in 2004 that killed rapists by summary and subsequently expanded their targets to include drug dealers and addicts.

==== Beggars and recyclers ====
Another group includes those individuals in the most extreme form of poverty. These individuals subsist by asking for money and/or collecting garbage. The police have been known to kill these victims in especially cruel ways, such as pouring gasoline on them and setting them on fire. It is also notable that at least 14 destitute individuals have been killed by security guards at one Colombian university for the use of their bodies as cadavers in the medical school.

=== Perpetrators and motivations ===
==== National Police ====
The National Police has played a large role in carrying out class-based killings in Colombia. The police created the term "disposable" (Spanish: desechable) to define economically disadvantaged people who are considered to have no value to society. Whether directly or through "paramilitary clients", the National Police was responsible for 74% of deaths related to social cleansing in 1992. Motivations include "security, aesthetics, economic well-being, morals, and religion". In regards to safety and economic well-being, rationales include the idea that the poor are or look like criminals and decrease public safety and drive customers away from businesses. Moral arguments include protection from homosexuals and prostitutes.

==== Death squads and paramilitary groups ====
The distinction between death squads and paramilitary groups and the National Police is not always clear. Not only are policemen often members of these groups, but these groups typically enjoy the protection of the police. Other members include businessmen, industrialists, guerillas, and soldiers. Death squads emerged in the late 1970s, one of the first being the Black Hand, a group that murdered suspected criminals. Their reasoning behind these killings is the flawed legal system, which convicts less than 3% of criminals. Death squads and other groups believe it necessary to step in where the legal system has failed by eliminating these suspected criminals. As of 1995, there were no less than 40 of these squads operating in Colombia.

=== Other factors ===
==== National government ====
The role of the national government in Colombia has largely been complicit cooperation with the National Police. By failing to deal with crime and then also effectively granting impunity to police and military groups, the state has allowed safety issues to be addressed with violence and has perpetuated a "cycle of crime, lack of public safety, violent response, and impunity" due to "terrifying inefficiency and unwillingness to hold people accountable for their acts". While the government at least tries to protect street children through programs to put them in state-run homes, these programs often do not align with their actual needs and have largely failed. There have been limited attempts to protect those in poverty in the legal system, and one case of harassment against the poor resulted in a judge calling for their equal treatment and compensation from the offending policemen. However, the decision was not enforced.

== In Guatemala ==
=== Victims and methods ===
Social cleansing and gang killings make up a large portion of the homicides in Guatemala. Since gangs typically make no effort to cover up crimes and leave bodies at the place of death, "signs of torture", as well as location of the body, "serve as indicators of the existence of social cleansing", according to Elizabeth Sanford. According to a study by the Human Rights Ombudsman, "the increase in the number of women killed whose bodies bore marks of torture and other sadistic abuse accounted for 40 percent of the total increase in female murders in 2005." Though female victims account for 10% of all homicides, over 18% of cadavers with signs of torture indicating social cleansing were female. Furthermore, 2% of female victims of homicide are prostitutes, a common victim group of social cleansing efforts. Furthermore, young and destitute male gang members, especially those blamed for homicide of females, have been common victims of social cleansing. The most common form of killing, indicated by the 305 cadavers found in 2005, is strangulation. Other common methods included victims being beaten, shot in the head, bound by their hands and feet, and in the case of female victims, sexual abuse. Victims are abducted, taken to a different location, are tortured and killed, and finally have their body dumped in a different location.

=== Perpetrators and motivations ===
Perpetrators include the Guatemalan government as well as private groups either directly or indirectly complicit with the state. Social cleansing efforts are targeted against gangs and other perceived and actual criminals, who are blamed for the high rates of homicide. The perpetrators intend to both exterminate victims and intimidate other members of the target group. Intimidation is carried out both through torture tactics used as well as propaganda including flyers and stickers that support social cleansing as a "method of social control". Because perpetrators are directly or indirectly tied to the state, they naturally have impunity.

=== Origins ===
The use of "social cleansing" efforts to eliminate criminals and other persons deemed to be socially dangerous has its origins during the period of military dictatorship and civil war (1954–1996). During the 1960s and 70s, many state-operated paramilitary front organizations (so-called "death squads") emerged with the express purpose of exterminating suspected communists and other enemies of the state. These groups included the MANO, NOA, CADEG, 'Ojo por Ojo' and others. While nominally employed against political targets, the use of "death squads" came to be seen by the Guatemalan police forces (specifically the National Police) as a crime fighting tool, particularly after the election of Col. Arana Osorio in 1970 and the subsequent "state of siege". One early example of the use of "death squads" against non-political targets was a phantom organization called the 'Avenging Vulture', which specifically targeted criminals.

== In Peru ==
The San Miguel del Ene attack was perpetrated in 2021. Leaflets left in the area described the action as a social cleansing operation.

== In South Korea ==
In South Korea, during the military dictatorship in the 1970s and 1980s, the government pursued a program that forced thousands of people off the streets into government funded privately run welfare centers. This was exacerbated by preparation for the 1988 Seoul Olympics with ordinance No. 410 from President Chun Doo-Hwan. A notable welfare center was Brothers Home.

== In Tanzania ==
=== Victims and methods ===
The most common victims of social cleansing efforts in Tanzania are elderly women, the majority of whom are of low socioeconomic status, but several groups of people who are considered burdens to the community, such as children, the sick, infants, and the handicapped, are also victims. These people are usually accused of witchcraft following deaths or other misfortunes in society and tend to flee, choosing homelessness over death. Those who do not flee successfully are killed violently in their homes. Sometimes those considered burdens are simply reduced to zero consumption and are starved to death. This occurs particularly among infants, who have no ability to flee or attempt to provide for themselves.

=== Perpetrators and motivations ===
Victims are typically killed by members of their own families, who blame them for economic suffering and household misfortune. Accusations and subsequent killings are often incited by death or illness in the family or the family's livestock. However, general misfortune in the form of "failed crops, lost jobs, and bad dreams also arouse suspicion". While often accusations are raised to the effect of creating a scapegoat, not all forms of social cleansing are connected to witch hunting. The extreme scarcity theory suggests that some families to drive out or starve unproductive family members to provide more nutrients for other members. Many of these perpetrators are young, unemployed men who see the elderly as a burden on their potential for success. Another key perpetrator of social cleansing in Tanzania are the Sungusungu, councils of male elders that operate under the premise of promoting village security. These groups formed under the premise that the government was not able to prevent crimes such as theft, and they serve as a form of vigilante justice.

=== Other actors ===
Although the Tanzanian government has made public witchcraft accusations illegal, the efforts to stop them have been unsuccessful. Conviction levels are extremely low, as "only seven of 1,622 individuals arrested in connection with witch killings during the 1970s and 1980s were convicted, and since then the conviction rate as apparently fallen even lower," according to Edward Miguel. The perception of the government and police force as unable to control crime has led groups such as Sungusungu to take matters into their own hands, though studies suggest that the police may sometimes be involved in witch killings.

== See also ==
- Aporophobia
- Classicide
- Communal violence
- Cultural conflict
- Cultural genocide
- Cultural rights
- Crimes against humanity
- Dahiya doctrine
- Democide
- Domicide
- Environmental killings
- Ethnic cleansing
- Ethnic conflict
- Ethnic hatred
- Ethnic nationalism
- Ethnic violence
- Ethnocide
- Extrajudicial killing
- Extrajudicial punishment
- Genocide
- Hate crime
- Hate group
- La Noche de las Tres Pes
- Life unworthy of life
- List of ethnic cleansing campaigns
- List of ethnic riots
- Lynching
- Pogrom
- Police brutality
- Political cleansing of population
- Political violence
- Population cleansing
- Purge
- Sectarian violence
- Religious violence
- Terrorism
- The Holocaust
- Vigilantism
- Violence against LGBT people
- War crime
