= Final Solutions =

2003 book

- Author: Benjamin Valentino
- Subject: Political history, genocide
- Publisher: Cornell University Press
- Publication date: December 2003
- Pages: 336
- ISBN: 9780801439650

Final Solutions: Mass Killing and Genocide in the 20th Century is a 2003 book by Benjamin Valentino on the political factors of mass killing and genocide.

== Bibliography ==
- Alexander, Gerard (2004). "Review of Final Solutions: Mass Killing and Genocide in the 20th Century". The Virginia Quarterly Review. 80 (4): 280. ISSN 0042-675X. JSTOR 26439765.
- Aydin, Aysegul (2006). "Review of Final Solutions: Mass Killing and Genocide in the 20th Century". Journal of Peace Research. 43 (4): 499. doi:10.1177/002234330604300423. ISSN 0022-3433. JSTOR 27640374.
- Ikenberry, G. John (September 2004). "Review of Final Solutions: Mass Killing and Genocide in the 20th Century". Foreign Affairs. 83 (5): 164–165. doi:10.2307/20034079. ISSN 0015-7120. JSTOR 20034079.
- Krain, Matthew (2006). "Review of Agents of Atrocity: Leaders, Followers, and the Violation of Human Rights in Civil War; Final Solutions: Mass Killing and Genocide in the Twentieth Century". Perspectives on Politics. 4 (1): 233–235. doi:10.1017/S1537592706870143. ISSN 1537-5927. JSTOR 3688700.
- Scott, Otis L. (2005). "Review of Reigns of Terror; Final Solutions: Mass Killing and Genocide in the Twentieth Century". The International History Review. 27 (4): 909–912. ISSN 0707-5332. JSTOR 40109729.
- Stanton, Gregory H. (2004). "Review of Final Solutions: Mass Killing and Genocide in the 20th Century". The Wilson Quarterly. 28 (4): 116–117. ISSN 0363-3276. JSTOR 40261531.
- Straus, Scott (2007). Levene, Mark; Mann, Michael; Midlarsky, Manus I.; Sémelin, Jacques; Valentino, Benjamin A.; Weitz, Eric D. (eds.). "Second-Generation Comparative Research on Genocide". World Politics. 59 (3): 476–501. doi:10.1017/S004388710002089X. ISSN 0043-8871. JSTOR 40060166.
