= Benjamin Valentino =

Political scientist and professor (born 1971)

Benjamin Andrew Valentino (born 1971) is a political scientist and professor at Dartmouth College. His 2004 book Final Solutions: Mass Killing and Genocide in the 20th Century, adapted from his PhD thesis and published by Cornell University Press, has been reviewed in several academic journals.

== Analysis ==
=== Analysis of genocide and mass killing ===
In Final Solutions: Mass Killing and Genocide in the 20th Century, Valentino sees ruler's motives, rather than ideology, as the key factor explaining the onset of genocide. (Note: Valentino's proposed concept is that mass killings are the results of leader's personality, rather than some particular ideology, or socioeconomic, ethnic, or other factors. Valentino analyzed eight separate cases divided on three subgroups. For each case or subgroup, Valentino engaged in an analysis of similar societies which did not engage in mass killings.) Valentino says that ideology, racism, and paranoia can shape leaders' beliefs for why genocide and mass killing can be justified. (Note: For Valentino, ideology is not an important factor, while the leader's personality is the key factor that can explain mass killings. In explaining why ideology alone, or as he terms it "positive support", is not the cause of mass killing, Valentino quotes the maxim "When good men do nothing", which is often incorrectly attributed to Edmund Burke, and says that mass killing occurs when victims are unable to escape or defend themselves, and when passive people, who are unaffected by it, provide "negative support" by not being willing to take risk on behalf of others. Valentino writes that "mass killing often seems to require little more than what might be called 'negative support'—the inability of victims to escape or defend themselves, the absence of organized domestic or international perpetrators, and the lack of public willingness to take personal risks on behalf on others." According to Valentino, discrimination, hatred, and negative stereotypes directed at social groups "may not be enough on their own to provoke support for extermination, but widespread attitudes of this king may be sufficient to block effective opposition to it." In this sense, Valentino quotes Vladimir Brovkin as saying that "a vote for the Bolsheviks in 1917 was not a vote for Red Terror or even a vote for dictatorship of the proletariat." For Valentino, most scholars do not attribute the Nazis' electoral success to "the appeal of radical anti-Semitic ideas, let alone support for the extermination of the Jews", and says that the Nazi regime, and Adolf Hitler in particular, "remained broadly popular even as increasingly radical anti-Semitic measures were enacted.") Valentino outlines two major category of mass killings, namely dispossessive mass killings and coercive mass killings. The first category includes ethnic cleansing, killings that accompany agrarian reforms in some Communist states and killings during colonial expansion, among others. The second category includes killings during counterinsurgency warfare and killings as part of imperialist conquests by the Axis powers during World War II, among others. Valentino does not see authoritarianism or totalitarianism as explaining mass killing.^{See quotes}

Valentino develops his mass killing (Note: Valentino defines mass killing as "the intentional killing of a massive number of noncombatants", where a massive number is defined as at least 50,000 intentional deaths over the course of five years or less; this is the most accepted quantitative minimum threshold for the term. Valentino states that "mass killings on a smaller scale" also appear to have been carried out by Communist regimes in eastern Europe, North Korea, Vietnam, and in the Third World, using a threshold of 1,000 killed, but the lack of documentation prevents definitive judgement about the scale of these events and the motives of the perpetrators. Valentino attributes killings from the Soviet invasion of Afghanistan and occupation of the country between 1978 and 1989 as counter-guerrilla mass killing. Citing Rudolph Rummel and The Black Book of Communism, both of which are controversial for their high-end estimates and have been criticized by other scholars for their flaws and methodology, among others, Valentino estimates that mass killings in the Soviet Union, the People's Republic of China, and Democratic Kampuchea ranged from a low of 21 million to a high of 70 million, and writes that the "highest end of the plausible range of deaths attributed to communist regimes" was "up to 110 million.") concept through eight-case studies, three of which fit the legal definition of genocide (the Armenian genocide, the Holocaust, and the Rwandan genocide), while the other five are about politicide cases of the Soviet Union under Joseph Stalin, Communist China under Mao Zedong, Democratic Kampuchea under the Khmer Rouge, (Note: Valentino did not analyze or generalize all Communist states and mass killing, Communist mass killings in general, or that they belong to the same category, considering Stalin's mass killings as a different category from those in Afghanistan. The chapter "Communist Mass Killings" describes the three concrete cases (Stalin, Mao, and Pol Pot), which are then contrasted with another case (Afghanistan), which is categorized as counter-guerrilla mass killing. Valentino writes: "Communism has a bloody record, but most regimes that have described themselves as communist or have been described as such by others have not engaged in mass killing. In addition to shedding light on why some communist states have been among the most violent regimes in history, therefore, I also seek to explain why other communist countries have avoided this level of violence.") the anti-communist regime in Guatemala (the Guatemalan genocide), and Afghanistan during the Soviet–Afghan War. Although he does not consider ideology or regime type as an important factor that explains these killings, Valentino outlines Communist mass killing as a subtype of dispossessive mass killing, which is considered as a complication of original theory his book is based on. In regard to Communist mass killings, (Note: Valentino says that mass killing is not caused by communism, or any particular ideology, and writes that it occurs when power is in the hands of one person or a small number of people, and there is a "revolutionary desire to bring about the rapid and radical transformation of society.") Valentino does not connect them and only discusses the Stalin era, the Mao era, and the Khmer Rouge rule of Cambodia, and excludes counter-insurgency mass killings, which he groups in his book with similar killings by capitalist regimes; they were not ideologically driven but resulted from the same motivations as non-Communist states.

=== Power transition theory ===
Writing with Richard Ned Lebow and critiquing power transition theory, Valentino states, "Power transition theorists have been surprisingly reluctant to engage historical cases in an effort to show that wars between great powers have actually resulted from the motives described by their theories."

== Selected works ==
- Bach-Lindsay, Dylan; Huth, Paul; Valentino, Benjamin (May 2004). "Draining the Sea: Mass Killing and Guerrilla Warfare". International Organization. 58 (2). Cambridge: Cambridge University Press: 375–407. doi:10.1017/S0020818304582061. JSTOR 3877862. S2CID 154296897.
- Croco, Sarah; Huth, Paul; Valentino, Benjamin (April 2006). "Covenants without the Sword: International Law and the Protection of Civilians in Times of War". World Politics. 58 (3). Cambridge: Cambridge University Press: 339–377. doi:10.1353/wp.2007.0004. ISSN 0043-8871. JSTOR 40060139. S2CID 153623647.
- Ulfelder, Jay; Valentino, Benjamin (February 2008). "Assessing Risks of State-Sponsored Mass Killing". Social Science Research Network. doi:10.2139/ssrn.1703426. SSRN 1703426.
- Valentino, Benjamin (2005) [2003]. Final Solutions: Mass Killing and Genocide in the 20th Century (1st paperback ed.). Itacha, NY: Cornell University Press. ISBN 978-0801472732. JSTOR 10.7591/j.ctt24hg9z.
- Valentino, Benjamin (May 2014). "Why We Kill: The Political Science of Political Violence against Civilians". Annual Review of Political Science. 17 (1). Palo Alto, CA: Annual Reviews: 89–103. doi:10.1146/annurev-polisci-082112-141937.

== Quotes ==
1. (Stanton 2004) says:

"That's traditional perspective on it, but Valentino believes otherwise. In his view, mass killing represents a rational choice of elites to achieve or stay in political power in the face of perceived threats to their dominance. Valentino develops his argument through eight case studies. Three fit the legal definition of genocide (the intentional destruction, in whole or in part, of a 'national, ethnical, racial, or religious group'): Armenia, the Holocaust, and Rwanda. The remaining five amount to what political scientist Barbara Harff calls 'politicide,' mass killing for political reasons: Stalin's Soviet Union, Mao's China, the Khmer Rouge's Cambodia, Guatemala, and Soviet-occupied Afghanistan. By emphasizing cases of politicide over those of genocide, Valentino stacks the deck in favor of his politics-centered argument from the start."

2. (Alexander 2004) states:

"Valentino sets out to diminish the role that ethnicist ideologies and other social dysfunctions play in explanations of genocides. He instead traces these terrible outcomes to small sets of committed rulers, for whom mass murder is an instrumental means to such ends as regime security from suspect or threatening minority groups. As such, his thesis touches directly on the question of whether such regimes require the active support of at least important segments of the general population in order to carry out genocides. In arguing they do not, he categorizes most citizens of afflicted societies as bystanders and frontally challenges Daniel Jonah Goldhagen's claim that a committed regime and an 'eliminationist' culture are both necessary conditions for a genocidal outcome. Valentino tests his thesis against an array of evidence that is admirable in two ways. First, including Maoist China and military-ruled Guatemala retrieves often-overlooked cases for our consideration. Second, adding China, the USSR, and Soviet occupied Afghanistan may remind readers—too many of whom need reminding—just how many innocents were slaughtered by Communist regimes. For its many virtues, the analysis disappoints in two key ways. First, the study does not really identify the origins of rulers' beliefs about the threats they face. This matters because if he cannot explain in rationalist terms why Nazis believed they had to kill Jewish grandmothers in Poland, then Valentino risks inviting ideational explanations for genocides in through the back door, preserving the form of an instrumentalist account but not its content. Second, he ultimately does not explain why rulers resorted to genocide to deal with threats as opposed to other option."

3. (Ikenberry 2004) writes:

"In this astute and provocative study, Valentino argues instead that leaders, not societies, are to blame. In most cases, he finds that powerful leaders use mass killing to advance their own interests or indulge their own hatreds, rather than to carry out the desires of their constituencies. This 'strategic' view emerges from a review of mass killing in the Soviet Union, China, and Cambodia; ethnic killing in Turkish Armenia, Nazi Germany, and Rwanda; and counter-guerrilla killing in Guatemala and Afghanistan."

4. (Priselac 2005) says:

"After defining mass killing as the intentional killing of noncombatants resulting in 50,000 or more deaths within a five-year period, Valentino examines a number of specific cases to explain his theory. In this 'strategic approach' to assessing mass killing, Valentino divides his case studies into three types: Communist, ethnic and counter-guerrilla. He examines the communist regimes of Stalin, Mao, and Pol Pot; mass killing based on ethnicity in Rwanda, Nazi Germany, and Turkey; and mass killings during counter-guerrilla operations in the Guatemalan civil war and under the Soviet occupation of Afghanistan. One of Valentino’s central arguments is that 'characteristics of society at large, such as pre-existing cleaves, hatred and discrimination between groups and non-democratic forms of government, are of limited utility in distinguishing societies at high risk for mass killing.' Valentino's strongest arguments in support of this statement are his comparative studies of regimes that committed mass killing with similar regimes that did not."

5. (Chirot 2005) states:

"He claims that almost all cases are initiated by small groups of leaders, not by mass hatred or intolerance nor by poverty and suffering. Those deplorable conditions are very widespread, yet mass political murder on a genocidal scale is much less frequent. Not only is it beyond our capacity to end human nastiness and misery, but in any case, leaders not structural conditions or the wrong cultural values are responsible for mass slaughter. Perhaps even more important is the clear evidence that genocidal acts are ordered by those leaders for instrumental purposes, to gain very specific political ends. They are neither irrational outbursts of emotion nor driven by mass hatred. They are calculated strategies by powerful elites, sometimes even by single dictators who feel that they and their cherished programs are gravely endangered by the existence of hostile enemies who must be either terrorized into submission or eliminated entirely. Not trading with them, or threatening them with justice, is unlikely to stop them because by the time the decision to engage in mass killing has been taken, they view the situation as desperate.

Looking only at the 20th-century cases and focusing on eight specific cases, Valentino is able to provide a reasonable amount of detail about each one to support his strong conclusions. He divides the kinds of 'final solutions' into three types. First, he looks at Stalin's mass murders, at those in Mao’s China, and at the Khmer Rouge genocide. In all three cases, a small cadre of leaders led by a dedicated revolutionary chief was driven by utopian fantasies and ideological certitude that made it see enemies everywhere and kill millions. The fact that the leaders' people did not conform to revolutionary ideals could not mean that these ideals were wrong but that, instead, there were many traitors and saboteurs who had to be eliminated. Their revolutionary paranoia was much more than the personal monstrosity of each of these leaders but a fundamental part of their worldview and that of those immediately around them."

6. (Scott 2005) writes:

"Valentino argues for a 'strategic approach' to understand the etiology of mass killing that 'seeks to identify the specific situations, goals, and conditions that give leaders incentives to consider this kind of violence' (p. 67). He tells us that this approach is more productive because it focuses the observers' attention on mass killing as a strategy to a larger end and not necessarily an end in itself. We are reminded that mass public support is unnecessary for mass killings to occur. All that is needed is a group of people — large or small — having the requisite resources: political power, the ability to employ force, and opportunity to work their murderous mayhem.

Valentino's typology of mass killings is well supported by persuasive examples of episodes of violence against civilians. These cover a wide historical sweep, from the former Soviet Union, Turkish Armenia, and Nazi Germany, to the more recent examples from Cambodia, Guatemala, Afghanistan and Rwanda."

7. (Krain 2006) says:

"Valentino lays out the strategic logic of mass killing at length and proceeds to examine in separate chapters three different types of cases—communist, ethnic, and counter-guerrilla mass killings—each with its own unique and deadly logic. In each chapter, relevant cases of mass killings are subjected to thorough historical process tracing in order to highlight the role of the elite decision-making calculus. In each chapter, the author also briefly discusses cases in which mass killings did not occur."

8. (Aydin 2006) states:

"In Final Solutions, Valentino investigates the roots of this human tragedy and finds the answers — not in broad political and social structures within a society frequently modeled in human security studies, but in the goals and perceptions of small and powerful groups carrying out these policies. Valentino's rationalist approach to the study of mass killings is novel and insightful. He presents historical evidence that shows that leaders resorting to 'final solutions' are highly influenced by radical goals that touch the social fabric of society and their perception of effective strategies to best suppress the popular dissent that usually follows the implementation of these goals. Most importantly, Valentino's analysis is far reaching. Its emphasis on the rationality of killers and the instrumentality of mass killings shows that the scientific study of mass killings is possible and desirable, despite the ethical dimension of the issue."

9. (Tago & Wayman 2010) writes:

"Disagreeing with Rummel's finding that authoritarian and totalitarian government explains mass murder, Valentino (2004) argues that regime type does not matter; to Valentino the crucial thing is the motive for mass killing (Valentino, 2004: 70). He divides motive into the two categories of dispossessive mass killing (as in ethnic cleansing, colonial enlargement, or collectivization of agriculture) and coercive mass killing (as in counter-guerrilla, terrorist, and Axis imperialist conquests)."

== Bibliography ==
- Alexander, Gerard (Fall 2004). "Review. Reviewed Work: Final Solutions: Mass Killing and Genocide in the 20th Century by Benjamin A. Valentino". The Virginia Quarterly Review. 80 (4). Charlottesville: University of Virginia: 280. JSTOR 26439765.
- Tago, Atsushi; Wayman, Frank (January 2010). "Explaining the Onset of Mass Killing, 1949–87". Journal of Peace Research. 47 (1). Thousand Oaks, CA: SAGE Publications: 3–13. doi:10.1177/0022343309342944. ISSN 0022-3433. JSTOR 25654524. S2CID 145155872.
- Aydin, Aysegul (July 2006). "Book Note: Final Solutions: Mass Killing and Genocide in the 20th Century". Journal of Peace Research. 43 (4). Thousand Oaks, CA: Sage Publications: 499. doi:10.1177/002234330604300423. S2CID 110293684.
- Chirot, Daniel (June 2005). "Book Review: Final Solutions: Mass Killing and Genocide in the 20th Century". Comparative Political Studies. 38 (5). Oxford: Oxford University Press: 578–580. doi:10.1177/0010414004273858. S2CID 154671052.
- Christie, Kenneth (Fall 2005). Gellately, Robert; Kiernan, Ben (eds.). "The Specter of Genocide: Mass Murder in Historical Perspective, and: Final Solutions: Mass Killings and Genocide in the 20th Century (review)". Holocaust and Genocide Studies. 19 (2). Oxford: Oxford University Press: 317–321. doi:10.1017/CBO9780511819674. ISBN 978-0521527507. ISSN 1476-7937 – via Project MUSE.
- Esteban, Joan Maria; Morelli, Massimo; Rohner, Dominic (May 2010). "Strategic Mass Killings". Working Paper No. 486. Zurich Switzerland: Institute for Empirical Research in Economics, University of Zurich. SSRN 1615375.
- Ikenberry, John (September–October 2004). "Review. Reviewed Work: Final Solutions: Mass Killing and Genocide in the 20th Century by Benjamin A. Valentino". Foreign Affairs. 83 (5). New York City, New York: Council on Foreign Relations: 164–165. doi:10.2307/20034079. JSTOR 20034079. S2CID 142455663.
- Krain, Matthew (March 2006). "Agents of Atrocity: Leaders, Followers, and the Violation of Human Rights in Civil War and Final Solutions: Mass Killing and Genocide in the Twentieth Century". Perspectives on Politics. 4 (1). Cambridge, England: Cambridge University Press: 233–235. doi:10.1017/S1537592706870143. JSTOR 3688700. S2CID 144289110.
- Miller, Paul (August 2005). "Miller on Valentino, 'Final Solutions: Mass Killing and Genocide in the Twentieth Century'". H-Net. H-Genocide.
- Priselac, Jessica (January 2005). "Final Solutions: Mass Killing and Genocide in the Twentieth Century". SAIS Review of International Affairs. 25 (1). Baltimore, MD: Johns Hopkins University: 207–209. doi:10.1353/sais.2005.0015. S2CID 154407248.
- Scott, Otis (December 2005). "Review. Reviewed Work: Reigns of Terror by Patricia Marchak; Final Solutions: Mass Killing and Genocide in the Twentieth Century by Benjamin A. Valentino". The International History Review. 27 (4). London: Taylor & Francis: 909–912. JSTOR 40109729.
- Stanton, Gregory (Autumn 2004). "Review. Reviewed Work: Final Solutions: Mass Killing and Genocide in the 20th Century by Benjamin A. Valentino". The Wilson Quarterly. 28 (4). Washington, D.C.: Woodrow Wilson International Center for Scholars. JSTOR 40261531 – via Gale.
- Straus, Scott (April 2007). "Review: Second-Generation Comparative Research on Genocide". World Politics. 59 (3). Cambridge: Cambridge University Press: 476–501. doi:10.1017/S004388710002089X. JSTOR 40060166. S2CID 144879341.
