= Mass killing =

Proposed concept for incidents of non-combat killing by a government or state

Mass killing is a concept which has been proposed by genocide scholars who aim to define incidents of non-combat killing which are perpetrated by a government or a state. A mass killing is commonly defined as the killing of group members without the intention to eliminate the whole group, or otherwise the killing of large numbers of people without a clear group membership.

Mass killing is used by a number of genocide scholars because genocide (its strict definition) does not cover mass killing events in which no specific ethnic or religious groups are targeted, or events in which perpetrators do not intend to eliminate whole groups or significant parts of them. Genocide scholars use different models in order to explain and predict the onset of mass killing events. There has been little consensus and no generally-accepted terminology, prompting scholars, such as Anton Weiss-Wendt, to describe comparative attempts a failure. Genocide scholarship rarely appears in mainstream disciplinary journals.

== Terminology ==
Several different terms are used to describe the intentional killing of large numbers of noncombatants, but there is no consensus or generally-accepted terminology. Mass killing has emerged as a "more straightforward" term than genocide or politicide. Mass killing was proposed by genocide scholars in attempts to collect a uniform global database of genocidal events and identify statistical models for prediction of onset of mass killings. Atsushi Tago and Frank Wayman reference mass killing as defined by Valentino and state that even with a lower threshold (10,000 killed per year, 1,000 killed per year, or even 1), "autocratic regimes, especially communist, are prone to mass killing generically, but not so strongly inclined (i.e. not statistically significantly inclined) toward geno-politicide." Other terms used by several authors to describe mass killings of non-combattents include:

- Classicide – "intended mass killing of entire social classes", which sociologist Michael Mann considers more apt than genocide for describing killings with the intent of suppression of the bourgeoisie in communist states.
- Gendercide – the systematic killing of members of a specific gender.
- Democide – political scientist Rudolph Rummel defined democide as "the intentional killing of an unarmed or disarmed person by government agents acting in their authoritative capacity and pursuant to government policy or high command"; according to Rummel, this definition covers a wide range of deaths, including forced labor and concentration camp victims, killings by unofficial private groups, extrajudicial summary killings and mass deaths in deliberate famines as well as killings by de facto governments, e.g. civil war killings. Rummel's democide concept is similar to geno-politicide, but there are two important differences. First, an important prerequisite for geno-politicide is government's intent to destroy a specific group. In contrast, democide deals with wider range of cases, including the cases when governments are engaged in random killing either directly or due to the acts of criminal omission and neglect. Second, whereas some lower threshold exists for a killing event to be considered geno-politicide, there is no low threshold for democide which covers any murder of any number of persons by any government.
- Genocide – under the Genocide Convention, the crime of genocide generally applies to mass murder of ethnic rather than political or social groups. Protection of political groups was eliminated from the United Nations resolution after a second vote because many states anticipated that clause to apply unneeded limitations to their right to suppress internal disturbances. Genocide is also a popular term for political killings which are studied academically as democide and politicide.
- Mass killing – referencing earlier definitions, (Note: Charny 2000 defines generic genocide as "the mass killing of substantial numbers of human beings, when not in the course of military action against the military forces of an avowed enemy, under conditions of the essential defenselessness and helplessness of the victims." In the 2006 article "Development, Democracy, and Mass Killings", William Easterly, Roberta Gatti, and Sergio Kurlat adopted Charny's definition of generic genocide for their use of mass killing and massacre to avoid the politics of genocide altogether.) Joan Esteban, Massimo Morelli, and Dominic Rohner define mass killings as "the killings of substantial numbers of human beings, when not in the course of military action against the military forces of an avowed enemy, under the conditions of the essential defenselessness and helplessness of the victims." Valentino defines the term as "the intentional killing of a massive number of noncombatants", where a "massive number" is at least 50,000 intentional deaths over the course of five years or less; this is the most accepted quantitative minimum threshold for the term.
- Politicide – some genocide scholars propose the concept of politicide to describe the killing of groups that would not otherwise be covered by the Genocide Convention. Barbara Harff studies genocide and politicide, sometimes shortened as geno-politicide, to include the mass killing of political, economic, ethnic, and cultural groups.

In the United States, the Investigative Assistance for Violent Crimes Act of 2012, passed in the aftermath of the Sandy Hook Elementary School shooting in Newtown, Connecticut, clarified the statutory authority for federal law enforcement agencies to provide investigatory assistance to the States, and mandated across federal agencies, including the Departments of Justice and Homeland Security, a definition of "mass killing" as three or more killings during an incident, while making no reference to the choice of weapon.

== Topology ==
Benjamin Valentino outlines two major categories of mass killings: dispossessive mass killing and coercive mass killing. The first category defines three types: communist, ethnic, and territorial, containing the following scenarios of ethnic cleansing, killings that accompany agrarian reforms in some Communist states, and killings during colonial expansion, among others. The second category includes the types: counterguerrilla, terrorist, and imperialist, containing the following scenarios of killing during counterinsurgent warfare, and killings as part of the imperialist conquests by the Axis powers during the World War II, among others.

Topology of mass killings as defined by Valentino, 2003
Type	Scenario	Examples (Note: It is not a complete list of all examples.)
	Dispossessive mass killing	
Communist	Agricultural collectivization and political terror	The Holodomor (1931–1933); Great Leap Forward (1958–1962); Cambodian genocide (1975–1979)
Fascist	Political terror and ethnic cleansing	Spanish White Terror (1936–1947); The Holocaust (1939–1945); Argentine Dirty War (1974–1983)
Ethnic	Ethnic cleansing	Armenian genocide (1915–1918); The Holocaust (1939–1945); Rwandan genocide (1994)
Territorial	Colonial enlargement	American Indian Wars (15th–20th centuries); Herero and Nama genocide (1904–1907)
Territorial	Expansionist wars	German annexation of western Poland (1939–1945); Herero and Nama genocide (1904–1907)
	Coercive mass killing	
Counterguerrilla	Guerrilla wars	Algerian War of Independence (1954–1962); Soviet invasion of Afghanistan (1979–1989); Ethiopian Civil War (1970s–1980s)
Terrorist	Terror bombing	Allied bombings of Germany and Japan (1940–1945); The Blitz (1940–1941)
Terrorist	Starvation blockades/siege warfare	Allied naval blockade of Germany (1914–1919); Nigerian land blockade of Biafra (1967–1970)
Terrorist	Sub-state/insurgent terrorism	FLN terrorism in Algerian war of independence against France (1954–1962); RENAMO terrorism in Mozambique (1976–1992); AUC terrorism in Colombia (1997–2008)
Imperialist	Imperial conquests and rebellions	German occupation of Western Europe (1940–1945); Japan's imperial conquests in East Asia (1910–1945)

== Analysis ==
Benjamin Valentino does not consider ideology or regime-type as an important factor that explains mass killings, and outlines Communist mass killing as a subtype of dispossessive mass killing, which is considered as a complication of original theory his book is based on. About why it occurs, Valentino states that ideology, paranoia, and racism can shape leaders' beliefs for why genocide and mass killing may be justified. Unlike Rudolph Rummel and first-generation studies, Valentino does not see authoritarianism or totalitarianism as explaining mass killing; it is not ideology or regime-type but the leader's motive that matters and can explain it, which is in line with second-generation scholarship.

Manus Midlarsky also focuses on leaders' decision making but his case selection and general conclusions are different from Valentino's. Midlarsky has a narrower definition of the dependent variable and only analyzes four case studies (the Armenian genocide, the Nakba, the Holocaust, and the Rwanda genocide). Midlarsky tries to explain why individuals may comply with the culprits, why politicide rather than genocide happened in Cambodia (Cambodian genocide), and why ethnic minorities, such as Greeks in the Ottoman Empire and Jews in the Second Polish Republic, were not targeted for genocide. Like Michael Mann and Valentino to a lesser extent, Midlarsky mainly addresses genocides that did not take place. Both Midlarsky and Valentino mainly focus on proximate conditions, while Mann considers genocide within the broad context of ideologies and nation-states development.

== Global databases of mass killings ==
At least two global databases of mass killings are available. The first compilation by Rudolph Rummel covers a time period from the beginning of the 20th century until 1987 covering democide, while the second compilation by Barbara Harff combines politicide and genocide since 1955. The Harff database is the most frequently used by genocide scholars, while the Rummel database is a good framework for studying mass killings during the 1900–1987 period.

These data are intended mostly for statistical analysis of mass killings in attempt to identify the best predictors for their onset. According to Harff, these data are not necessarily the most accurate for a given country, since some sources are general genocide scholars and not experts on local history. A comparative analysis of the Yugoslav data in two databases revealed a significant difference between the figures of killed per years and low correlation between Rummel's and Harff's data sets. Tomislav Dulić criticized Rummel's generally higher numbers as arising from flaws in Rummel's statistical methodology, and Rummel's response was not convincing.

Another comparative analysis of the two complete databases by Atsushi Tago and Frank W. Wayman revealed that the significant difference between the figures is explained by Harff's dataset of politicide-genocide being essentially a subset of Rummel's dataset, where he includes other types of killings in addition to politicide-genocide.

Genocides and politicides from 1955 to 2001 as listed by Harff, 2003 (Note: The list does not include deaths from the Great Chinese Famine and the Great Leap Forward.)
Country	Start	End	Nature of episode	Est. number of victims	Related articles
Sudan	October 1956	March 1972	Politicide with communal victims	400,000–600,000	First Sudanese Civil War
South Vietnam	January 1965	April 1975	Politicide	400,000–500,000	South Vietnam
China	March 1959	December 1959	Genocide and politicide	65,000	1959 Tibetan uprising
Iraq	June 1963	March 1975	Politicide with communal victims	30,000–60,000	Ba'athist Iraq
Algeria	July 1962	December 1962	Politicide	9,000–30,000	
Rwanda	December 1963	June 1964	Politicide with communal victims	12,000–20,000	Rwandan Revolution
Congo-Kinshasa	February 1964	January 1965	Politicide	1,000–10,000	Simba rebellion
Burundi	October 1965	December 1973	Politicide with communal victims	140,000	Ikiza
Indonesia	November 1965	July 1966	Genocide and politicide	500,000–1,000,000	Indonesian mass killings of 1965–1966
China	May 1966	March 1975	Politicide	400,000–850,000	Cultural Revolution
Guatemala	July 1978	December 1996	Politicide and genocide	60,000–200,000	Guatemalan genocide
Pakistan	March 1971	December 1971	Genocide and politicide	2,000,000–3,000,000	1971 Bangladesh genocide
Uganda	December 1972	April 1979	Politicide and genocide	50,000–400,000	Idi Amin
South West South Africa	1948	1994	Politicide and Terrorism	21,000-50,000	Apartheid
Abkhazia	1992	1998	Politicide and Ethnic cleasing	20,000-30,000	War in Abkhazia
Philippines	September 1972	June 1976	Politicide with communal victims	60,000	Martial law under Ferdinand Marcos
Pakistan	February 1973	July 1977	Politicide with communal victims	5,000–10,000	1970s operation in Balochistan
Cyprus	1955	1974	Ethnic violence and communal victims	6,000-10,000	Cyprus problem
Chile	September 1973	December 1976	Politicide	5,000–10,000	Human rights abuses in Chile under Augusto Pinochet
Angola	November 1975	2001	Politicide by UNITA and government forces	500,000	Angolan Civil War
Cambodia	April 1975	January 1979	Politicide and genocide	1,900,000–3,500,000	Cambodian genocide
Indonesia	December 1975	July 1992	Politicide with communal victims	100,000–200,000	East Timor genocide
Romania	1965	1989	Politicide	60,000-200,000	Nicolae Ceaușescu
Argentina	March 1976	December 1980	Politicide	9,000–20,000	Dirty War
Ethiopia	July 1976	December 1979	Politicide	10,000	Qey Shibir
Congo-Kinshasa	March 1977	December 1979	Politicide with communal victims	3,000–4,000	
Afghanistan	April 1978	April 1992	Politicide	1,800,000	Soviet–Afghan War
Burma	January 1978	December 1978	Genocide	5,000	Operation Dragon King
El Salvador	January 1980	December 1989	Politicide	40,000–60,000	Salvadoran Civil War
Uganda	December 1980	January 1986	Politicide and genocide	200,000–500,000	Ugandan Bush War
Syria	March 1981	February 1982	Politicide	5,000–30,000	1982 Hama massacre
Iran	June 1981	December 1992	Politicide and genocide	10,000–20,000	Casualties of the Iranian Revolution; 1988 executions of Iranian political prisoners
Yugoslavia	1945	1945	Politicide and mass killing	70.000-200.000	Bleiburg repatriations
Sudan	September 1983	?	Politicide with communal victims	2,000,000	Second Sudanese Civil War
India	November 1984	November 1984	Pogrom	3,000-30,000	1984 anti-Sikh riots
Iraq	March 1988	June 1991	Politicide with communal victims	180,000	1991 Iraqi uprisings
Somalia	May 1988	January 1991	Politicide with communal victims	15,000–50,000	
Burundi	1988	1988	Genocide	5,000–20,000	Hutu massacres of 1988
Sri Lanka	September 1989	January 1990	Politicide	13,000–30,000	1987–1989 JVP insurrection
Bosnia	May 1992	November 1995	Genocide	225,000	Bosnian genocide
Burundi	October 1993	May 1994	Genocide	50,000	Burundian genocides
Rwanda	April 1994	July 1994	Genocide	500,000–1,000,000	Rwandan genocide
Serbia	December 1998	July 1999	Politicide with communal victims	10,000	War crimes in the Kosovo War

== See also ==
- Anti-communist mass killings
- Genocide of indigenous peoples
- List of battles by casualties
- List of genocides by death toll
- List of wars by death toll
- Mass killings under communist regimes
- Mass murder

== Bibliography ==
- Tago, Atsushi; Wayman, Frank (January 2010). "Explaining the Onset of Mass Killing, 1949–87". Journal of Peace Research. 47 (1). Thousand Oaks, California: SAGE Publications: 3–13. doi:10.1177/0022343309342944. ISSN 0022-3433. JSTOR 25654524. S2CID 145155872.
- Bach-Lindsday, Dylan; Huth, Paul; Valentino, Benjamin (May 2004). "Draining the Sea: Mass Killing and Guerrilla Warfare". International Organization. 58 (2). Cambridge, England: Cambridge University Press: 375–407. doi:10.1017/S0020818304582061. JSTOR 3877862. S2CID 154296897.
- Charny, Israel W., ed. (2000). Encyclopedia of Genocide (1st ed.). Santa Barbara, California: ABC-CLIO. ISBN 978-0-874-36928-1.
- Curthoys, Ann; Docker, John (2008). "Defining Genocide". In Stone, Dan (ed.). The Historiography of Genocide (paperback ed.). Basingstoke, England: Palgrave Macmillan UK. pp. 7–41. ISBN 978-0-230-27955-1.
- Dulić, Tomislav (January 2004). "Tito's Slaughterhouse: A Critical Analysis of Rummel's Work on Democide". Journal of Peace Research. 41 (1). Thousands Oaks, California: SAGE Publications: 85‒102. doi:10.1177/0022343304040051. JSTOR 4149657. S2CID 145120734.
- Easterly, William; Gatti, Roberta; Kurlat, Sergio (June 2006). "Development, Democracy, and Mass Killings". Journal of Economic Growth. 11 (2). New York City, New York: Springer: 129–156. doi:10.1007/s10887-006-9001-z. JSTOR 40216091. S2CID 195313778.
- Esteban, Joan Maria; Morelli, Massimo; Rohner, Dominic (May 2010). "Strategic Mass Killings". Working Paper No. 486. Zurich Switzerland: Institute for Empirical Research in Economics, University of Zurich. SSRN 1615375.
- Gleditish, N. P., ed. (2017). R.J. Rummel: An Assessment of His Many Contributions. SpringerBriefs on Pioneers in Science and Practice. Vol. 37. New York City, New York: Springer. ISBN 978-3-319-54463-2.
- Gurr, Ted Robert; Harff, Barbara (September 1988). "Toward Empirical Theory of Genocides and Politicides: Identification and Measurement of Cases since 1945". International Studies Quarterly. 32 (3). Hoboken, New Jersey: Wiley: 359–371. doi:10.2307/2600447. ISSN 0020-8833. JSTOR 2600447.
- Harff, Barbara (Summer 1996). "Review: Death by Government by R. J. Rummel". The Journal of Interdisciplinary History. 27 (1). Cambridge, Massachusetts: The MIT Press: 117–119. doi:10.2307/206491. JSTOR 206491.
- Harff, Barbara (February 2003). "No Lessons Learned from the Holocaust? Assessing Risks of Genocide and Political Mass Murder since 1955". The American Political Science Review. 97 (1). Washington, D.C.: American Political Science Association: 57–73. doi:10.1017/S0003055403000522. JSTOR 3118221. S2CID 54804182.
- Harff, Barbara (2017). "The Comparative Analysis of Mass Atrocities and Genocide". In Gleditish, N. P. (ed.). R.J. Rummel: An Assessment of His Many Contributions. SpringerBriefs on Pioneers in Science and Practice. Vol. 37. New York City, New York: Springer. pp. 111–129. doi:10.1007/978-3-319-54463-2_12. ISBN 978-3-319-54463-2.
- Jones, Adam (2010). Genocide: A Comprehensive Introduction (English paperback 2nd ed.). London, England: Routledge. ISBN 978-0-415-48619-4.
- Krain, Matthew (June 1997). "State-Sponsored Mass Murder: The Onset and Severity of Genocides and Politicides". Journal of Conflict Resolution. 41 (3). Thousand Oaks, California: SAGE Publications: 331–360. doi:10.1177/0022002797041003001. ISSN 0022-0027. JSTOR 174282. S2CID 143852782.
- Mann, Michael (2005). The Dark Side of Democracy: Explaining Ethnic Cleansing (English paperback ed.). Cambridge, England: Cambridge University Press. ISBN 978-0-521-53854-1.
- Ott, Attiat (2011). "Modeling Mass Killing: For Gain or Ethnic Cleansing?". In Hartley, Keith (ed.). Handbook on the Economics of Conflict. Cheltenham, England: Edward Elgar Publishing. pp. 52–79. ISBN 978-0-857-93034-7.
- Schaak, Beth (May 1997). "The Crime of Political Genocide: Repairing the Genocide Convention's Blind Spot". The Yale Law Journal. 106 (7): 2259‒2291. doi:10.2307/797169. JSTOR 797169.
- Sémelin, Jacques; et al. (Hoffman, Stanley) (2007). Purify and Destroy: The Political Uses of Massacre and Genocide. The CERI Series in Comparative Politics and International Studies. Translated by Schoch, Cynthia. New York City, New York: Columbia University Press. ISBN 978-0-231-14282-3.
- Staub, Ervin (1989). The Roots of Evil: The Origins of Genocide and Other Group Violence (illustrated, reprinted, revised paperback ed.). Cambridge, England: Cambridge University Press. ISBN 978-0-521-42214-7.
- Staub, Ervin (2011). Overcoming Evil: Genocide, Violent Conflict, and Terrorism (illustrated, reprinted hardback ed.). Oxford, England: Oxford University Press. ISBN 978-0-195-38204-4.
- Stone, Dan, ed. (2008). The Historiography of Genocide (paperback ed.). Basingstoke, England: Palgrave Macmillan. ISBN 978-0-230-27955-1.
- Straus, Scott (April 2007). "Review: Second-Generation Comparative Research on Genocide". World Politics. 59 (3). Cambridge, England: Cambridge University Press: 476–501. doi:10.1017/S004388710002089X. JSTOR 40060166. S2CID 144879341.
- Valentino, Benjamin (2004). Final Solutions: Mass Killing and Genocide in the Twentieth Century (hardback ed.). Ithaca, New York: Cornell University Press. ISBN 978-0-801-43965-0. OCLC 53013098.
- Verdeja, Ernesto (June 2012). "The Political Science of Genocide: Outlines of an Emerging Research Agenda". Perspectives on Politics. 10 (2). Washington, D.C.: American Political Science Association: 307–321. doi:10.1017/S1537592712000680. JSTOR 41479553. S2CID 145170749.
- Weiss-Wendt, Anton (2008). "Problems in Comparative Genocide Scholarship". In Stone, Dan (ed.). The Historiography of Genocide (paperback ed.). Basingstoke, England: Palgrave Macmillan. pp. 42–70. doi:10.1057/9780230297784. ISBN 978-0-230-27955-1.
