= Virgilio Piñera =

Cuban writer

- Born: Virgilio Piñera Llera; August 4, 1912; Cárdenas, Cuba
- Died: October 18, 1979 (aged 67); Havana, Cuba
- Education: University of Havana
- Occupation: Writer
- Writing career
- Language: Spanish
- Years active: 1941-1979
- Notable works: La isla en peso, Cuentos Fríos, Un fogonazo, La carne de René, Electra Garrigó.

Virgilio Piñera Llera (August 4, 1912 – October 18, 1979) was a Cuban author, playwright, poet, short story writer, essayist and translator. His best known works are the poem La isla en peso (1943), the collection of short stories Cuentos Fríos (1956), the novel La carne de René (1952) and the play Electra Garrigó (1959). He is also known for his role in the translation into Spanish of the novel Ferdydurke, by Polish writer Witold Gombrowicz.

Piñera is one of the most celebrated authors of Cuban literature. His work explores alienation, absurd and madness, featuring characters that often find themselves in ridiculous and grotesque scenarios.

He was openly homosexual; however, born into a Christian family, Piñera struggled with guilt and later, after the Cuban Revolution, with the government's ostracism. Nevertheless, Piñera's work was rediscovered by Cuban and Latin American authors such as Severo Sarduy, Víctor Fowler, Rolando Sánchez and Ricardo Piglia. His works were reedited on his 100th centenary and a commission presided by Antón Arrufat organized a colloquium in his honour.

== Biography ==
=== Early life ===
Virgilio Piñera was born in Cárdenas, Cuba. In 1925, he and his family moved to Camagüey, where he obtained his high school diploma. In 1938, he established himself in Havana, earning his doctoral degree in philosophy and letters from the University of Havana in 1940. Beginning the previous year, he began to publish his poems in the literary magazine Espuela de plata (Silver Spur), the predecessor to Orígenes. In 1941, he wrote his first collection of poems, Las furias (The Furies), and his best known play, Electra Garrigó. The latter was premiered in Havana eight years later and was poorly received by the press.

In 1942, Piñera founded and headed the magazine Poeta (Poet). The following year, he published La isla en peso (The Weight of the Island), subsequently regarded as one of the heights of Cuban literature, but in its time the object of scorn from fellow poets Gastón Baquero, Eliseo Diego, and critics such as Cintio Vitier. Together with José Lezama Lima and José Rodríguez Feo, he founded Orígenes, despite his aesthetic disagreements with them. Among his most notable contributions were a number of poems, an essay titled El secreto de Kafka (The Secret of Kafka), and another essay on Argentine literature.

=== Residency in Argentina ===
In February 1946, Piñera traveled to Buenos Aires, where he would remain on and off until 1958, working for the Cuban Embassy as a proofreader and translator. While in Argentina, he forged friendships with Jorge Luis Borges, Victoria Ocampo, Graziella Peyrou, and José Bianco. Bianco contributed the foreword to Piñera's collection of short stories, El que vino a salvarme (The One Who Came to Save Me), published by Editorial Sudamericana. Piñera also became friendly with Witold Gombrowicz and presided, with the help of Cuban writer Humberto Rodríguez Tomeu, the committee that translated Ferdydurke into Spanish. During this period, he wrote his plays Jesús and Falsa alarma (False Alarm).

Piñera's first novel, La carne de René (René's Flesh), was published in 1952. Three years later, after a bitter dispute among the co-founders led to the closure of Orígenes, he founded his final magazine, Ciclón (Cyclone). He would also occasionally contribute to Sur, as well as to the French magazines Lettres Nouvelles and Les Temps modernes.

=== Censorship in Cuba ===
In 1958, he left Argentina and settled permanently in Cuba. He arrived there shortly before the Cuban Revolution and contributed to the newspaper Revolución and its supplement Lunes de Revolución. In 1960, he staged Electra Garrigó once again and published his complete plays. In 1968, he received Premio Casa de las Américas for the play Dos viejos pánicos (Two Old Panics), which would not be performed in Cuba until the 1990s.

Virgilio Piñera was arrested in the Night of the Three Ps in 1961 and briefly detained, but was released shortly after due to international pressure.

Beginning in 1971, Piñera was ostracized by the Cuban government and literary establishment because of his sharply divergent ideological beliefs and his homosexuality. He died on October 18, 1979, and his remains were buried in his native Cárdenas.

== English-language translations ==
- René's Flesh, translated by Mark Schafer. Foreword by Antón Arrufat. Eridanos Press, 1988. ISBN 0-941419-40-1
- Cold Tales, translated by Mark Schafer. Introduction by Guillermo Cabrera-Infante. Eridanos Press, 1988.
- Electra Garrigó, translated by Margaret Carson. In Stages of Conflict: A Critical Anthology of Latin American Theater and Performance, ed. Diana Taylor and Sarah J. Townsend. Ann Arbor: U Michigan Press, 2008.
