= Development-induced displacement =

Type of forced migration of humans

Development-induced displacement and resettlement (DIDR) occurs when people are forced to leave their homes in a development-driven form of forced migration. Historically, it has been associated with the construction of dams for hydroelectric power and irrigation, but it can also result from various development projects such as mining, agriculture, the creation of military installations, airports, industrial plants, weapon testing grounds, railways, road developments, urbanization, conservation projects, and forestry.

Development-induced displacement is a social problem affecting multiple levels of human organization, from tribal and village communities to well-developed urban areas. Development is widely viewed as an inevitable step towards modernization and economic growth in developing countries; however, for those who are displaced, the result is most often loss of livelihood and impoverishment.

Classification of development-induced displaced persons (DIDPs), refugees and internally displaced persons rests on fundamental differences in the type of assistance provided to each category. Refugees and internally displaced persons typically need international protection and assistance as a result of fleeing violence and persecution. Development-induced displaced persons require the restoration of their capacity to generate income and protection from the state. While people displaced as a result of development have similar experiences to refugees (as defined by the UNHCR) in terms of economic and social loss, they are not protected by international law.

== Types of displacement ==
"Primary" or "direct" displacement occurs when people are moved from their traditional lands to make way for a development project or when people move towards a project to meet a new labor demand. Primary displacement is usually predictable and can therefore be mitigated through planning.

"Secondary" or "indirect" displacement is a result of environmental, geographical and socio-political consequences of the development project that take place over time and distance from the initial project. This type of displacement is less predictable and difficult to control. One example of secondary displacement is if a community is forced to move because of pollution of their water supply by a mining project.

Some examples of development-induced displacement are:

- Three Gorges Dam in China – A hydroelectric dam on China's Yangtze River constructed between 1994 and 2006, which displaced over 1.4 million people through primary and secondary displacement.
- Sardar Sarovar Dam in India – The largest dam in the Narmada Valley Project, which displaced over 40,000 people. The dam was the subject of protest by environment groups and tribal groups during the 1980s and 1990s.
- Ahafo Mine in Ghana – An open-pit mine which displaced approximately 10,000 people in 2005 and 2006. Most of the displaced were subsistence farmers, but the mining company, Newmont, denied them compensation for loss of land.
- Kuno Wildlife Sanctuary in India – Between 1999 and 2003, 24 villages were displaced to reintroduce the Asiatic Lion to the area. Resettlement and enforcement of forest boundaries disrupted social and economic ties between the displaced and the host community.
- Pacific Park/Atlantic Yards in the US – A mixed-use development in New York City that began construction on 2010, involving eminent domain, the destruction of 12 buildings, and several lawsuits.

== Effects ==
It has been estimated that fifteen million people each year are forced to leave their homes as a result of public and private development projects and that number continues to increase as countries move from developing to developed nations.

Compensation and rehabilitation policies designed to mitigate effects of displacement are often unsuccessful. This is largely due to corruption of street level bureaucrats, underestimation of the value of resources, failure of planners to recognize the intricacies of the existing social and economic systems of the displaced and lack of involvement of displaced persons in the planning process. Communities and individuals are most often only compensated monetarily, without proper mechanisms for addressing their grievances or political support to improve their livelihoods. When land is used as compensation, it is often inadequate in terms of size, location and natural resources. Land tenure laws may also prevent resettlement policy from being effective. Poor and indigenous people are mostly affected by displacement as they have few political and monetary resources.

Michael Cernea's impoverishment and reconstruction model (IRR) sets forth eight potential risks of displacement:

1. Landlessness
2. Joblessness
3. Homelessness
4. Marginalization
5. Food insecurity
6. Increased morbidity and mortality
7. Loss of access to common property
8. Social Disarticulation

The consensus among researchers is that impoverishment due to loss of capacity to generate income is the most apparent effect of DIDR. Additionally, displacement severs social ties which are often crucial for survival in indigenous communities. Loss of connection to historical, religious, symbolic or spatial locations resulting from forced migration diminishes cultural identity. Development-induced displaced persons, like refugees and internally displaced persons, experience psychological stress as well as feelings of helplessness and distrust towards their government and humanitarian groups. While the state is charged with protecting them as equal citizens, they are considered "others" and left to bear the cost for those who will benefit.

Women are disproportionately affected by DIDR as the loss of land used by women to generate economic worth further marginalizes their socio-economic standing as they become more dependent on their husbands.

== Policy and mitigation ==
The work of sociologists and anthropologists studying displaced populations gradually led to a body of theoretical and conceptual knowledge. Development planners were eventually forced to rely on the work of social scientists in order to devise resettlement plans. Cernea explains that, assisted by dissent from NGOs and displaced persons themselves, a "ripple effect" of early policies led to expansion of resettlement policy which continues to broaden over time.

Resettlement policy may be adopted by the state, regional associations, private development companies, NGOs, large financial institutions and the United Nations. Regardless of the source of the policy, local-level participation during all stages of the planning process is crucial to mitigating negative outcomes. Policies adopted by large financial institutions (mainly the World Bank and OECD), NGOs (The Brookings Institution) and the World Commission on Dams provide guidelines for resettlement of those displaced by development. Implementation of these policies is often lacking and, with no political mandate, the guidelines are usually ineffective. State involvement is dependent on political will but the precarious position of the state as "player and referee" leaves the displaced with little protection.

In 1998, the United Nations was presented with the Guiding Principals on Internal Displacement, a set of guidelines proposed by group of legal scholars identifying rights and protections for internally displaced people. These guidelines specifically name the state as the protector of the rights of its citizens against the effects of development-induced displacement. Should the state fail to protect the rights of DIDRs, the Guidelines state that the international community must respond. In 2002, the United Nations Office for the Coordination of Humanitarian Affairs established an IDP Unit to investigate instances of DIDR. There is currently no enforceable international law governing DIDR.

== See also ==
- Economic migrants (not to be confused with "development-induced displacement", as the cause of their migration is not necessarily "development", but is to the contrary likely caused by the absence of development.
- Indian Removal
- Forced displacement
