= Night of the Three Ps =

1961 police raid in Havana, Cuba

- Part of the Aftermath of the Cuban Revolution
- Location: Havana, Cuba
- Date: October 11, 1961
- Target: Official; Prostitutes, pimps, "pájaros" Unofficial; Artists, intellectuals, vagrants, voodoo practitioners
- Attack type: Social cleansing razzias
- Victim: Thousands
- Perpetrator: "Social Scum Squad"
- Motive: Enforcement of revolutionary morality

The Night of the Three Ps (Spanish: La Noche de las Tres Pes) was a massive police raid on October 11, 1961 in Havana targeting prostitutes, pimps, and "pájaros" (a term coined in Cuba to refer to homosexuals). Cuban poet Virgilio Piñera was arrested the morning after the raid but quickly released to avoid international scandal. The raid was the first moralist round up of the new Castro government and would be the beginning of various round-ups in Cuba of people considered undesirables. The raid took place at a time of heightened moral campaigns in Cuba demonizing homosexuality and other qualities considered uncompatible with the Cuban revolutionary "new man". The raid of the Night of the Three Ps officially targeted prostitutes (Spanish: prostitutas), "pájaros", and pimps (Spanish: proxenetas). Scholars and observers have noted that the police raid making the Night of the Three Ps could be better understood as having taken place for longer than that one night. Carlos Franqui noted in his memoir that the real targets of the raid included homosexuals, intellectuals, artists, vagrants, voodoo practitioners, and anyone deemed suspicious.

== Background ==
By 1961, the new Cuban government was coming at odds with the United States and a greater animosity between the two countries was brewing. With the threat of the United States looming over Cuba, many in the Cuban government were able to rationalize abuses of power. This coincided with a greater moralistic purge of Cuba. Prostitutes were becoming retrained as seamstresses, and homosexuality and drug addiction were becoming linked in the public imagination. The threat of United States aggression made identification with the Cuban government prominent. Appeals to intense loyalty made it easier to demonize homosexuals who were seen as having no use to the new Cuban government.

Since 1959, the Cuban government had promoted the idea of a "new man". This new man was motivated by social duty rather than monetary gain, he would ignore personal indulgences for the good of greater society. Eventually, this new man would also reject homosexuality as a selfish and unnatural practice compared to biologically reproductive heterosexuality.

The police would initiate "Operation Three Ps" out of a purely moralistic desire to purge the street of vices in general. Raids specifically targeting homosexuals would not become common until a couple years later.

== Events ==
=== Havana arrests ===
On the night of October 11, 1961, a police unit known as the "Social Scum Squad" embarked on a massive raid in Havana, the goal to arrest anyone believed to be a pimp, prostitute, or pederast. Police cars surrounded red light districts like the Colón neighborhood while officers arrested anyone who couldn't produce state issued IDs. Other officers went door to door arresting specific people previously identified by the Committees for the Defense of the Revolution.

The raid would net thousands of people who would be arrested and taken into custody. When in custody the prisoners would be given uniforms with the letter "P" on the back, giving the inspiration for the name of the raid in popular memory.

=== Detention of Piñera ===
Cuban writer Virgilio Piñera would be arrested during the raid. The arrest technically occurred in the early morning daybreak after the raid. As Piñera went to his local cafe for an early morning coffee someone asked his name, once Piñera responded the man claimed to be a police officer and then put him under arrest. Once arrested Piñera asked if he could return home quickly to change his outfit before entering jail. The officer allowed it, and while walking to his home the officer informed him that he had been arrested for "assault on revolutionary morality". Once at Piñera's home the officer demanded to search it, when searching it he discovered Piñera's friend and his friend's lover sleeping in another room, the officer would arrest the couple as well.

The detention of Piñera would only last 24 hours until he was released. Piñera was released as the arrest of a prominent Cuban writer could have created an international scandal.

== See also ==
- Cuban literacy campaign
- Guevarism
