= Population transfer =

Movement of a large group of people from one region to another

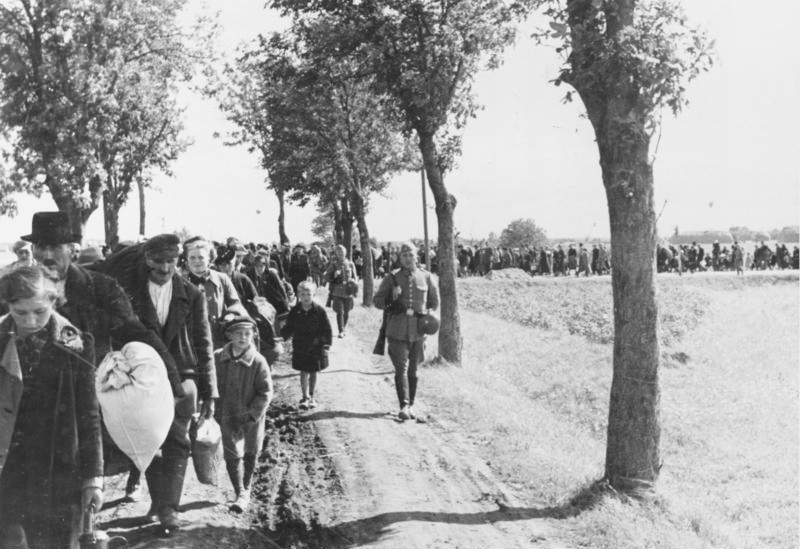
Beginning of Lebensraum, the Nazi German expulsion of Poles from central Poland, 1939

Population transfer or resettlement is a type of mass migration that is often imposed by a state policy or international authority. Such mass migrations are most frequently spurred on the basis of ethnicity or religion, but they also occur due to economic development. Banishment or exile is a similar process, but is forcibly applied to individuals and groups. Population transfer differs more than simply technically from individually motivated migration, but at times of war, the act of fleeing from danger or famine often blurs the differences.

Often the affected population is transferred by force to a distant region, perhaps not suited to their way of life, causing them substantial harm. In addition, the process implies the loss of immovable property and substantial amounts of movable property when rushed. This transfer may be motivated by the more powerful party's desire to make other uses of the land in question or, less often, by security or disastrous environmental or economic conditions that require relocation.

The first known population transfers date back to the Middle Assyrian Empire in the 13th century BCE, with forced resettlement being particularly prevalent during the Neo-Assyrian Empire. The single largest population transfer in history was the Partition of India in 1947 that involved up to 12 million people in Punjab Province with a total of up to 20 million people across British India, with the second largest being the flight and expulsion of Germans after World War II, which involved more than 12 million people. The aftermath of the war also saw the massive Allied repatriation of Soviet citizens which involved 4.2 million people who had been displaced by the German occupation.

Before the forcible deportation of Ukrainians (including thousands of children) to Russia during the Russian invasion of Ukraine, the last major population transfer in Europe was the deportation of 800,000 ethnic Albanians during the Kosovo War in 1999. Moreover, some of the largest population transfers in Europe have been attributed to the ethnic policies of the Soviet Union under Joseph Stalin.

Population transfers can also be imposed to further economic development, for instance China relocated 1.3 million residents in order to construct the Three Gorges Dam.

== Historical background ==
The earliest known examples of population transfers took place in the context of war and empire. As part of Sennacherib's campaign against King Hezekiah of Jerusalem (701 BCE) "200,150 people great and small, male and female" were transferred to other lands in the Neo-Assyrian Empire. Similar population transfers occurred under the Achaemenid and Byzantine Empires. Population transfers are considered incompatible with the values of post-Enlightenment European societies, but this was usually limited to the home territory of the colonial power itself and population transfers continued in European colonies during the 20th century.

== Specific types of population transfer ==
=== Population exchange ===
Population exchange is the transfer of two populations in opposite directions at about the same time. In theory at least, the exchange is non-forcible, but the reality of the effects of these exchanges has always been unequal, and at least one half of the so-called "exchange" has usually been forced by the stronger or richer participant. Such exchanges have taken place several times in the 20th century:

- The partition of India and Pakistan
- The mass expulsion of Anatolian Greeks and Balkan Turks from Turkey and Greece, respectively, during their so-called Greek-Turkish population exchange. It involved approximately 1.3 million Anatolian Christians (majority Greek) and 354,000 Balkan Muslims (majority Turkish), most of whom were forcibly made refugees and de jure denaturalized from their homelands.
- The 1940 peaceful population exchange between Bulgaria and Romania
- The Cyprus population exchange following the Turkish invasion of Cyprus in 1974 that led to displacement of 140,000 Greeks from the north and around 60,000 Turks that have relocated from the south to the north.

=== Ethnic dilution ===
Ethnic dilution is the practice of enacting immigration policies to relocate parts of an ethnically and/or culturally dominant population into a region populated by an ethnic minority or otherwise culturally different or non-mainstream group to dilute and eventually to transform the native ethnic population into the mainstream culture over time.

== Changes in international law ==
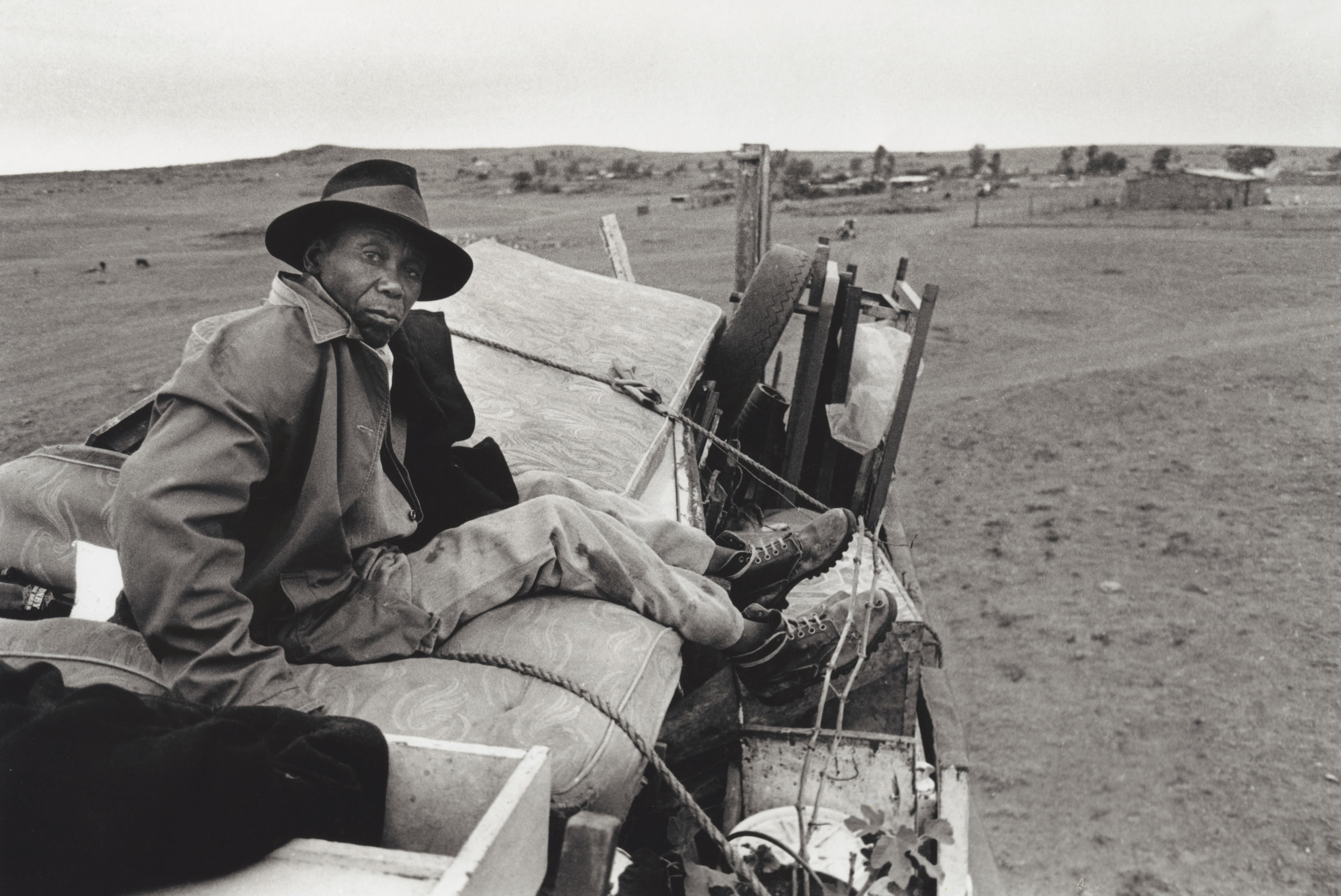
Forced removal under apartheid, Mogopa, Western Transvaal, South Africa, February 1984.

According to the political scientist Norman Finkelstein, population transfer was considered as an acceptable solution to the problems of ethnic conflict until around World War II and even for a time afterward. Transfer was considered a drastic but "often necessary" means to end an ethnic conflict or ethnic civil war. The feasibility of population transfer was hugely increased by the creation of railroad networks from the mid-19th century. George Orwell, in his 1946 essay "Politics and the English Language" (written during the World War II evacuation and expulsions in Europe), observed:

"In our time, political speech and writing are largely the defence of the indefensible. Things... can indeed be defended, but only by arguments which are too brutal for most people to face, and which do not square with the professed aims of political parties. Thus political language has to consist largely of euphemism, question-begging and sheer cloudy vagueness.... Millions of peasants are robbed of their farms and sent trudging along the roads with no more than they can carry: this is called transfer of population or rectification of frontiers."

The view of international law on population transfer underwent considerable evolution during the 20th century. Prior to World War II, many major population transfers were the result of bilateral treaties and had the support of international bodies such as the League of Nations. The expulsion of Germans after World War II from Central and Eastern Europe after World War II was sanctioned by the Allies in Article 13 of the Potsdam communiqué, but research has shown that both the British and the American delegations at Potsdam strongly objected to the size of the population transfer that had already taken place and was accelerating in the summer of 1945. The principal drafter of the provision, Geoffrey Harrison, explained that the article was intended not to approve the expulsions but to find a way to transfer the competence to the Control Council in Berlin to regulate the flow. The tide started to turn when the Charter of the Nuremberg Trials of German Nazi leaders declared forced deportation of civilian populations to be both a war crime and a crime against humanity. That opinion was progressively adopted and extended through the remainder of the century. Underlying the change was the trend to assign rights to individuals, thereby limiting the rights of states to make agreements that adversely affect them.

There is now little debate about the general legal status of involuntary population transfers: "Where population transfers used to be accepted as a means to settle ethnic conflict, today, forced population transfers are considered violations of international law." No legal distinction is made between one-way and two-way transfers since the rights of each individual are regarded as independent of the experience of others.

Article 49 of the Fourth Geneva Convention (adopted in 1949 and now part of customary international law) prohibits mass movement of protected persons out of or into territory under belligerent military occupation:

Individual or mass forcible transfers, as well as deportations of protected persons from occupied territory to the territory of the Occupying Power or to that of any other country, occupied or not, are prohibited, regardless of their motive.... The Occupying Power shall not deport or transfer parts of its own civilian population into the territory it occupies.

An interim report of the United Nations Sub-Commission on Prevention of Discrimination and Protection of Minorities (1993) says:

Historical cases reflect a now-foregone belief that population transfer may serve as an option for resolving various types of conflict, within a country or between countries. The agreement of recognized States may provide one criterion for the authorization of the final terms of conflict resolution. However, the cardinal principle of "voluntariness" is seldom satisfied, regardless of the objective of the transfer. For the transfer to comply with human rights standards as developed, prospective transferees must have an option to remain in their homes if they prefer.

The same report warned of the difficulty of ensuring true voluntariness:

"some historical transfers did not call for forced or compulsory transfers, but included options for the affected populations. Nonetheless, the conditions attending the relevant treaties created strong moral, psychological and economic pressures to move."

The final report of the Sub-Commission (1997) invoked numerous legal conventions and treaties to support the position that population transfers contravene international law unless they have the consent of both the moved population and the host population. Moreover, that consent must be given free of direct or indirect negative pressure.

"Deportation or forcible transfer of population" is defined as a crime against humanity by the Rome Statute of the International Criminal Court (Article 7). The International Criminal Tribunal for the Former Yugoslavia has indicted and sometimes convicted a number of politicians and military commanders indicted for forced deportations in that region.

Ethnic cleansing encompasses "deportation or forcible transfer of population" and the force involved may involve other crimes, including crimes against humanity. Nationalist agitation can harden public support, one way or the other, for or against population transfer as a solution to current or possible future ethnic conflict, and attitudes can be cultivated by supporters of either plan of action with its supportive propaganda used as a typical political tool by which their goals can be achieved.

== In Europe ==
=== France ===
Two famous transfers connected with the history of France are the banning of the religion of the Jews in 1308 and that of the Huguenots, French Protestants by the Edict of Fontainebleau in 1685. Religious warfare over the Protestants led to many seeking refuge in the Low Countries, England and Switzerland. In the early 18th century, some Huguenots emigrated to colonial America. In both cases, the population was not forced out but rather their religion was declared illegal and so many left the country.

According to Ivan Sertima, Louis XV ordered all blacks to be deported from France but was unsuccessful. At the time, they were mostly free people of color from the Caribbean and Louisiana colonies, usually descendants of French colonial men and African women. Some fathers sent their mixed-race sons to France to be educated or gave them property to be settled there. Others entered the military, as did Thomas-Alexandre Dumas, the father of Alexandre Dumas.

Some Algerians were also forcefully removed from their native land by France in the late 19th century, and moved to the Pacific, most notably to New Caledonia.

=== Ireland ===
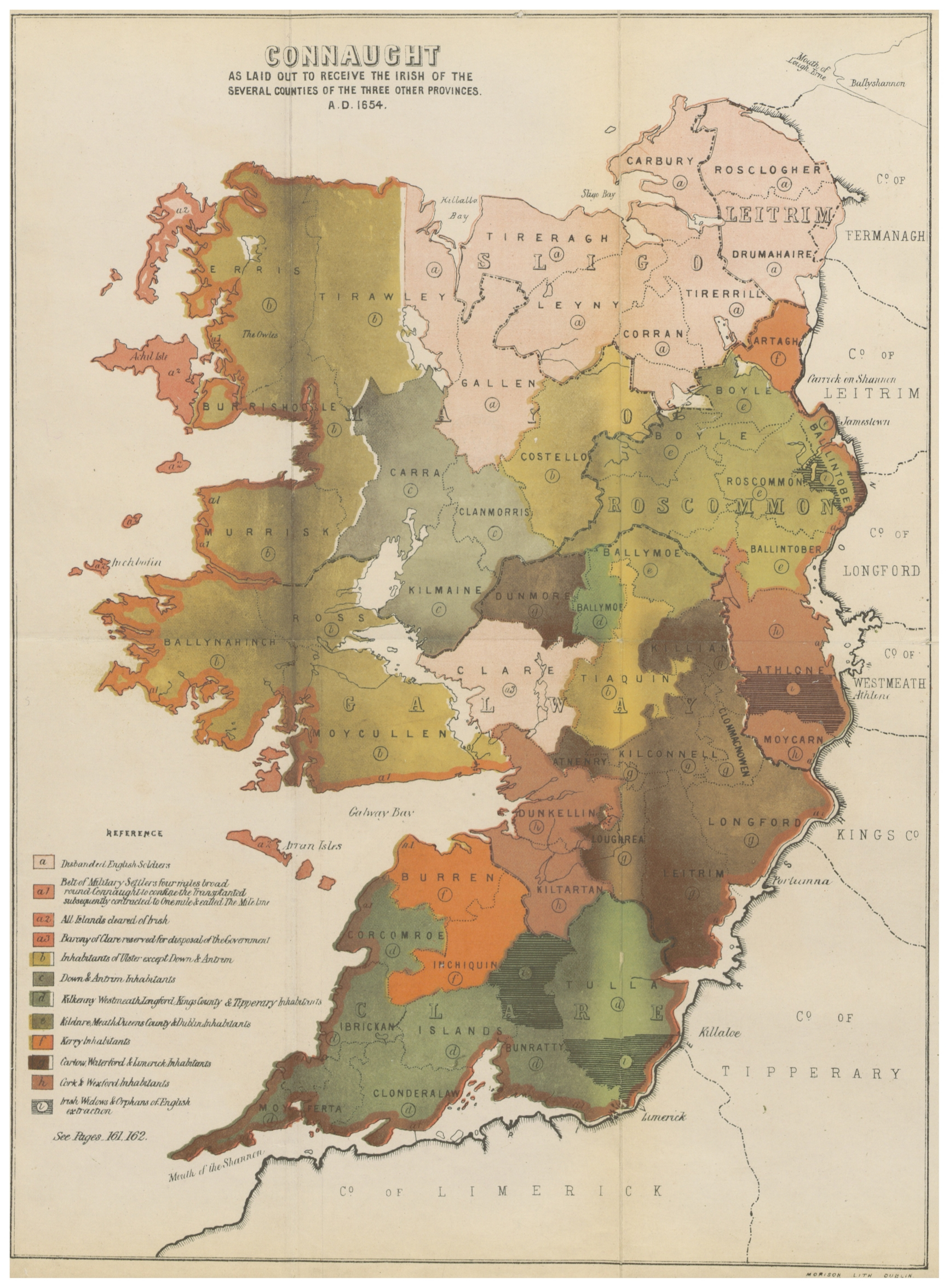
Map of land west of the River Shannon allocated to the native Irish after expulsion from their lands by the Act for the Settlement of Ireland 1652. Note that all offshore islands were "cleared of Irish" and a belt one mile wide around the coastline was reserved for English settlers.

After the Cromwellian conquest of Ireland and Act of Settlement in 1652, most indigenous Irish Catholic land holders had their lands confiscated and were banned from living in planted towns. An unknown number, possibly as high as 100,000 Irish were removed to the colonies in the West Indies and North America as indentured servants.

In addition, the Crown supported a series of population transfers into Ireland to enlarge the loyal Protestant population of Ireland. Known as the plantations, they had migrants come chiefly from Scotland and the northern border counties of England. In the late eighteenth century, the Scots-Irish constituted the largest group of immigrants from the British Isles to enter the Thirteen Colonies before the American Revolutionary War.

=== Scotland ===
The enclosures that depopulated rural England in the British Agricultural Revolution started during the Middle Ages. Similar developments in Scotland have lately been called the Lowland Clearances.

The Highland Clearances were forced displacements of the populations of the Scottish Highlands and Scottish Islands in the 18th century. They led to mass emigration to the coast, the Scottish Lowlands and abroad, including to the Thirteen Colonies, Canada and the Caribbean.

=== Central Europe ===
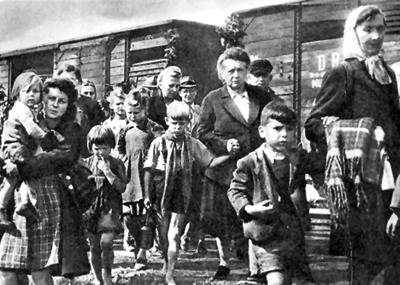
Germans being deported from the Sudetenland in the aftermath of World War II

Historically, expulsions of Jews and of Romani people reflect the power of state control that has been applied as a tool, in the form of expulsion edicts, laws, mandates etc., against them for centuries.

After the Molotov–Ribbentrop Pact divided Poland during World War II, Germans deported Poles and Jews from Polish territories annexed by Nazi Germany, and the Soviet Union deported Poles from areas of Eastern Poland, Kresy to Siberia and Kazakhstan. From 1940, Adolf Hitler tried to get Germans to resettle from the areas in which they were the minority (the Baltics, South-Eastern and Eastern Europe) to the Warthegau, the region around Poznań, German Posen. He expelled the Poles and Jews who formed there the majority of the population. Before the war, the Germans were 16% of the population in the area.

The Nazis initially tried to press Jews to emigrate and in Austria succeeded in driving out most of the Jewish population. However, increasing foreign resistance brought the plan to a virtual halt. Later on, Jews were transferred to ghettoes and eventually to death camps. Use of forced labor in Nazi Germany during World War II occurred on a large scale. Jews who had signed over properties in Germany and Austria during Nazism, although coerced to do so, found it nearly impossible to be reimbursed after World War II, partly because of the ability of governments to make the "personal decision to leave" argument.

The Germans abducted about 12 million people from almost twenty European countries; about two thirds of whom came from Eastern Europe. After World War II, when the Curzon line, which had been proposed in 1919 by the Western Allies as Poland's eastern border, was implemented, members of all ethnic groups were transferred to their respective new territories (Poles to Poland, Ukrainians to Soviet Ukraine). The same applied to the formerly-German territories east of the Oder-Neisse line, where German citizens were transferred to Germany. Germans were expelled from areas annexed by the Soviet Union and Poland as well as territories of Czechoslovakia, Hungary, Romania and Yugoslavia. From 1944 until 1948, between 13.5 and 16.5 million Germans were expelled, evacuated or fled from Central and Eastern Europe. The Statistisches Bundesamt (federal statistics office) estimates the loss of life at 2.1 million

Poland and Soviet Ukraine conducted population exchanges. Poles residing east of the new Poland-Soviet border were deported to Poland (2,100,000 persons), and Ukrainians that resided west of the New border were deported to Soviet Ukraine. Population transfer to Soviet Ukraine occurred from September 1944 to May 1946 (450,000 persons). Some Ukrainians (200,000 persons) left southeast Poland more or less voluntarily (between 1944 and 1945). The second event occurred in 1947 under Operation Vistula.

Nearly 20 million people in Europe fled their homes or were expelled, transferred or exchanged during the process of sorting out ethnic groups between 1944 and 1951.

=== Spain ===
In 1492 the Jewish population of Spain was expelled through the Alhambra Decree. Some of the Jews went to North Africa; others east into Poland, France and Italy, and other Mediterranean countries.

In 1609, was the Expulsion of the Moriscos, the final transfer of 300,000 Muslims out of Spain, after more than a century of Catholic trials, segregation, and religious restrictions. Most of the Spanish Muslims went to North Africa and to areas of Ottoman Empire control.

=== Southeastern Europe ===
In September 1940, with the return of Southern Dobruja by Romania to Bulgaria under the Treaty of Craiova, a population exchange was carried out. 103,711 Romanians, Aromanians and Megleno-Romanians were compelled to move north of the border, while 62,278 Bulgarians living in Northern Dobruja were forced to move into Bulgaria.

Around 360,000 Bulgarian Turks fled Bulgaria during the Revival Process.

During the Yugoslav wars in the 1990s, the breakup of Yugoslavia caused large population transfers, mostly involuntary. As it was a conflict fueled by ethnic nationalism, people of minority ethnicities generally fled towards regions that their ethnicity was the majority.

The phenomenon of "ethnic cleansing" was first seen in Croatia but soon spread to Bosnia. Since the Bosnian Muslims had no immediate refuge, they were arguably the hardest hit by the ethnic violence. United Nations tried to create safe areas for Muslim populations of eastern Bosnia but in the Srebrenica massacre and elsewhere, the peacekeeping troops failed to protect the safe areas, resulting in the massacre of thousands of Muslims.

The Dayton Accords ended the war in Bosnia and Herzegovina, fixing the borders between the two warring parties roughly to those established by the autumn of 1995. One immediate result of the population transfer after the peace deal was a sharp decline in ethnic violence in the region.

A massive and systematic deportation of Serbia's Albanians took place during the Kosovo War of 1999, with around 800,000 Albanians (out of a population of about 1.5 million) forced to flee Kosovo. Albanians became the majority in Kosovo at the wars end, around 200,000 Serbs and Roma fled Kosovo. When Kosovo proclaimed independence in 2008, the bulk of its population was Albanian.

A number of commanders and politicians, notably Serbia and Yugoslav President Slobodan Milošević, were put on trial by the UN's International Criminal Tribunal for the Former Yugoslavia for a variety of war crimes, including deportations and genocide.

=== Greece and Turkey ===
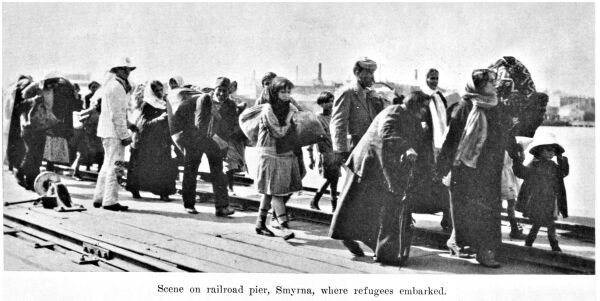
Greek refugees from Smyrna, 1922

Following the Greco-Turkish War of 1919–1922, the League of Nations defined those to be mutually expelled as the "Muslim inhabitants of Greece" to Turkey and moving "the Christian Orthodox inhabitants of Turkey" to Greece. The plan met with fierce opposition in both countries and was condemned vigorously by a large number of countries. Undeterred, Fridtjof Nansen worked with both Greece and Turkey to gain their acceptance of the proposed population exchange. About 1.5 million Christians and half a million Muslims were moved from one side of the international border to the other.

When the exchange was to take effect (1 May 1923), most of the prewar Orthodox Greek population of Aegean Turkey had already fled due to persecution and the Greek Genocide, and so only the Orthodox Christians of central Anatolia (both Greek and Turkish-speaking), and the Pontic Greeks were involved, a total of roughly 189,916. The total number of Muslims involved was 354,647.

The population transfer prevented further attacks on minorities in the respective states, and Nansen was awarded a Nobel Peace Prize. As a result of the transfers, the Muslim minority in Greece and the Greek minority in Turkey were much reduced. Cyprus and the Dodecanese were not included in the Greco-Turkish population transfer of 1923 because they were under direct British and Italian control respectively. For the fate of Cyprus, see below. The Dodecanese became part of Greece in 1947.

=== Italy ===
In 1939, Hitler and Mussolini agreed to give the German-speaking population of South Tyrol a choice (the South Tyrol Option Agreement): they could emigrate to neighbouring Germany (including the recently annexed Austria) or stay in Italy and accept to be assimilated. Because of the outbreak of World War II, the agreement was only partially consummated.

=== Cyprus ===
After the Turkish invasion of Cyprus and subsequent division of the island, there was an agreement between the Greek representative on one side and the Turkish Cypriot representative on the other side under the auspices of the United Nations on August 2, 1975. The Government of the Republic of Cyprus would lift any restrictions in the voluntary movement of Turkish Cypriots to the Turkish-occupied areas of the island, and in exchange, the Turkish Cypriot side would allow all Greek Cypriots who remained in the occupied areas to stay there and to be given every help to live a normal life.

Around 150,000 people (amounting to more than one-quarter of the total population of Cyprus, and to one-third of its Greek Cypriot population) were displaced from the northern part of the island, where Greek Cypriots had constituted 80% of the population. Over the course of the next year, roughly 60,000 Turkish Cypriots, amounting to half the Turkish Cypriot population, were displaced from the south to the north.

=== Soviet Union ===
Shortly before, during and immediately after World War II, Joseph Stalin conducted a series of deportations on a huge scale, which profoundly affected the ethnic map of the Soviet Union. Over 1.5 million people were deported to Siberia and the Central Asian republics. Separatism, resistance to Soviet rule and collaboration with the invading Germans were cited as the main official reasons for the deportations. After World War II, the population of East Prussia was replaced by the Soviet one, mainly by Russians.

Following the Yalta Conference, the Allies initiated a program of mandatory repatriation for Soviet citizens; 4.2 million Ostarbeiters, Soviet prisoners of war, and collaborators were transferred from both Soviet and Western occupation zones. While most returned voluntarily, Western forces coerced those resisting, including the British handover of Cossacks in 1945 and the late stage, localized Operation Keelhaul in 1946–1947, targeting military collaborators. Declassified archives disprove Cold-war era claims of immediate, widespread persecution of the returnees. 58% of repatriates were cleared to return home, while officials drafted 33.5% into the Red Army or labor battalions and transferred 6.5% to NKVD filtration camps. Rank-and-file collaborators were processed administratively and sent into exile to special settlements; courts sentenced officers and high-ranking civilian collaborators to the Gulag. Many returnees faced life-long social stigma.

=== Ukraine ===
Hundreds of thousands of Ukrainians have reportedly been forcibly deported to Russia during the 2022 Russian invasion of Ukraine. Because of Russia's deporting of thousands of Ukrainian children to Russia, the international criminal court issued an arrest warrant for Vladimir Putin the president of Russia and Maria Lvova-Belova Russia's commissioner for children's rights. As of 21 November 2023 there was 6,338,100 Ukrainian refugees fleeing the Russian invasion of Ukraine. Most (5,946,000) have gone to European countries but a minority (392,100) went to countries outside of Europe.

== In the Americas ==
=== Inca Empire ===
The Inca Empire dispersed conquered ethnic groups throughout the empire to break down traditional community ties and force the heterogeneous population to adopt the Quechua language and culture. Never fully successful in the pre-Columbian era, the policies had their greatest success when they were adopted, from the 16th century, to create a pan-Andean identity defined against Spanish rule. Much of the current knowledge of Inca population transfers comes from their description by the Spanish chroniclers Pedro Cieza de León and Bernabé Cobo.

The Spanish conquerors continued these Inca policies settling for example thousands of indigenous yanakuna from what is today Ecuador, Bolivia and Peru in the newly conquered central Chile. In 1666 the Spanish resettled the Quilmes people from the vicinity of San Miguel de Tucumán more than 1,000 km southeast in Quilmes next to Buenos Aires.

=== Canada ===
During the French and Indian War (the North American theatre of the Seven Years' War between Great Britain and France), the British forcibly relocated approximately 8,000 Acadians from the Canadian Maritime Provinces, first to the Thirteen Colonies and then to France. Thousands died of drowning, starvation, or illness as a result of the deportation. Some of the Acadians who had been relocated to France then emigrated to Louisiana, where their descendants became part of the French-American cultural group known as Cajuns.

Beginning with the Indian Act, but underlying federal and provincial policies towards Indigenous peoples throughout the 1800s and 1900s, the Canadian Government pursued a deliberate policy of forced relocation against hundreds of Indigenous communities. The Canadian Indian residential school system and the Indian reserve system (which forced Indigenous peoples off traditional territories and into small parcels of crown land in order to establish agricultural and industrial developments, and to begin the process of settler colonialism) are key to this history and have been seen by many scholars as evidence of the government's intent to "extinguish Aboriginal title through administrative and bureaucratic means". The efforts to displace Indigenous peoples from their traditional territories were also carried out by more brutal means. The Pass system, which controlled the supply of food and resources, movement in and out of reserve lands, and all other aspects of Indigenous peoples' lives, was implemented via the Indian Act in direct response to the 1885 North-West Rebellion, in which Cree, Metis, and other Indigenous peoples resisted the seizure of land and rights by the government. The North-West Mounted Police, precursor to the Royal Canadian Mounted Police, were likewise established as a direct response to Indigenous resistance against colonialism. Their purview was to carry out John A. Macdonald's colonial and national policies, especially in Rupert's Land, what would become the Prairie provinces.

The High Arctic relocation took place during the Cold War in the 1950s, when 87 Inuit were moved by the Government of Canada to the High Arctic. The relocation has been a source of controversy, and is an understudied aspect of forced migration instigated by the Canadian federal government to assert its sovereignty in the Far North against the Soviet Union. Relocated Inuit peoples were not given sufficient support and were not given a say in their relocation.

Numerous other indigenous peoples of Canada have been forced to relocate their communities to different reserve lands, including the 'Nak'waxda'xw in 1964.

==== Japanese Canadian internment ====
Japanese Canadian Internment refers to the detainment of Japanese Canadians following the attack on Pearl Harbor and the Canadian declaration of war on Japan during World War II. The forced relocation subjected Japanese Canadians to government-enforced curfews and interrogations and job and property losses. The internment of Japanese Canadians was ordered by Prime Minister Mackenzie King, largely because of existing racism. However, evidence supplied by the Royal Canadian Mounted Police and the Department of National Defence show that the decision was unwarranted.

Until 1949, four years after World War II had ended, all persons of Japanese heritage were systematically removed from their homes and businesses and sent to internment camps. The Canadian government shut down all Japanese-language newspapers, took possession of businesses and fishing boats, and effectively sold them. To fund the internment itself, vehicles, houses, and personal belongings were also sold.

=== United States ===
==== Independence ====
During and after the American Revolutionary War, many Loyalists were deprived of life, liberty or property or suffered lesser physical harm, sometimes under acts of attainder and sometimes by main force. Parker Wickham and other Loyalists developed a well-founded fear. As a result, many chose or were forced to leave their former homes in what became the United States, often going to Canada, where the Crown promised them land in an effort at compensation and resettlement. Most were given land on the frontier in what became Upper Canada and had to create new towns. The communities were largely settled by people of the same ethnic ancestry and religious faith. In some cases, towns were started by men of particular military units and their families.

==== Native American relocations ====
In the 19th century, the United States government removed an estimated number of 100,000 Native Americans to federally owned and federally designated Indian reservations. Native Americans were removed from the Eastern to the Western States. The most well-known removals were those of the 1830s from the Southeast, starting with the Choctaw people. Under the 1830 Indian Removal Act, the Five Civilized Tribes were relocated from their place, east of the Mississippi River, to the Indian Territory in the west. The process resulted in great social dislocation for all, numerous deaths, and the "Trail of Tears" for the Cherokee Nation. Resistance to Indian removal led to several violent conflicts, including the Second Seminole War in Florida.

As part of the California Genocide, in August 1863, all Konkow Maidu were to be sent to the Bidwell Ranch in Chico and then be taken to the Round Valley Reservation at Covelo in Mendocino County. Any Indians remaining in the area were to be shot. Maidu were rounded up and marched under guard west out of the Sacramento Valley and through to the Coastal Range. 461 Native Americans started the trek, 277 finished. They reached Round Valley on 18 September 1863.

The Long Walk of the Navajo refers to the 1864 relocation of the Navajo people by the US government in a forced walk from their land in what is now Arizona to eastern New Mexico. The Yavapai people were forcibly marched from Camp Verde Reservation to San Carlos Apache Indian Reservation, Arizona, on February 27, 1875, following the Yavapai War. The federal government restricted Plains Indians to reservations following several Indian Wars in which Indians and European Americans fought over lands and resources. Indian prisoners of war were held at Fort Marion and Fort Pickens in Florida.

After the Yavapai Wars 375 Yavapai perished in Indian Removal deportations out of 1,400 remaining Yavapai.

==== General Order No. 11 (1863) ====
General Order No. 11 is the title of a Union Army decree which was issued during the American Civil War on 25 August 1863, forcing the evacuation of rural areas in four counties in western Missouri. That decree was issued in response to an extensive insurgency and widespread guerrilla warfare. The Army cleared the area in an attempt to deprive the guerrillas of local support. Union General Thomas Ewing issued the order, which affected all rural residents regardless of their loyalty. Those who could prove their loyalty to the Union were permitted to stay in the region but had to leave their farms and move to communities near military outposts. Those who could not do so had to vacate the area altogether.

In the process, Union forces caused considerable property destruction and a large number of deaths because of conflicts.

==== Japanese American internment ====
In the wake of the Empire of Japan's attack on Pearl Harbor, decades-long suspicions and antagonisms towards ethnic Japanese mounted, causing the US government to order the military to forcibly relocate approximately 110,000 Japanese Americans along with Japanese nationals who were residing in the United States to newly constructed "War Relocation Camps," or internment camps, in 1942, where they were interned for the duration of the war. White Americans frequently bought their property at losses.

Japanese nationals and Japanese Americans who were residing on the West Coast of the United States were all interned. In Hawaii, where more than 150,000 Japanese Americans composed nearly a third of that territory's population, officials only interned 1,200 to 1,800 Japanese Americans. In the late 20th century, the US government paid some compensation to the survivors of the internment camps.

== In Asia ==
=== Ottoman Empire ===
The Ottoman Empire colonized newly conquered territories by deportation (sürgün) and resettlement, often to populate empty lands and establish settlements in logistically useful places. The term sürgün is known to us from Ottoman documents and comes from the verb sürmek (to displace). This type of resettlement primarily aimed to support daily governance of the Empire, but sometimes population transfers had ethnic or political concerns.

During Mehmet I's reign Tatar and Turkmen subjects were moved to the Balkans to secure areas along the border with Christian Europe. Conquered Christians were moved to Anatolia and Thrace. These population transfers continued into the reigns of Murad II and Mehmet II.

After Murad II's conquest of Salonika, Muslims were involuntarily relocated to Salonika, mostly from Anatolia and Yenice-i Vardar.

Mehmed the Conqueror resettled not only Muslims, but Christians and Jews as well, in his efforts to repopulate the city of Constantinople after its conquest in 1453.

According to the deportation decree issued in newly conquered Cyprus on 24 September 1572, one family out of every ten in the provinces of Anatolia, Rum (Sivas), Karaman and Zülkadriye were to be sent to Cyprus. These deportees were craftsmen or peasants. In exchange for relocating they would be exempt from taxes for two years.

From Bayezid II (d. 1512), the empire had difficulty with the heterodox Qizilbash movement in eastern Anatolia. The forced relocation of the Qizilbash continued until at least the end of the 16th century. Selim I (d. 1520) ordered merchants, artisans, and scholars transported to Constantinople from Tabriz and Cairo. The state mandated Muslim immigration to Rhodes and Cyprus after their conquests in 1522 and 1571, respectively, and resettled Greek Cypriots onto Anatolia's coast.

Knowledge among Western historians about the use of sürgün from the 17th through the 19th century is somewhat unreliable. It appears that the state did not use forced population transfers as much as during its expansionist period.

After the exchanges in the Balkans, the Great Powers and then the League of Nations used forced population transfer as a mechanism for homogeneity in the post-Ottoman Balkans to decrease conflict. The Norwegian diplomat Fridtjof Nansen, working with the League of Nations as a High Commissioner for Refugees in 1919, proposed the idea of a forced population transfer. That was modelled on the earlier Greek-Bulgarian mandatory population transfer of Greeks in Bulgaria to Greece and of Bulgarians in Greece to Bulgaria.

=== Palestine ===
In 1937 the British Peel Commission recommended partition of Mandatory Palestine which would have entailed a population transfer of Jews and Arabs, and the 1947 UN Partition Plan for Palestine also would have entailed a similar transfer of populations.

The 1948 Palestinian expulsion and flight, also known as "the Nakba", was the displacement of an estimated 700,000-750,000 Palestinian Arabs during the 1948 Palestine war. Refugees resettled in the Gaza Strip (under Egyptian control) and the West Bank (under Jordanian control), Jordan, Syria and Lebanon. Population displacement in the 1948 war affected some Jewish communities as well such as in Gush Etzion and East Jerusalem following Jordan's annexation of the West Bank.

There were further expulsions of Palestinians from 1949 to 1956. And in the 1967 Six-Day War an additional 280,000–325,000 Palestinians were expelled, many of them already refugees from 1948.

=== Persia ===
Removal of populations from along their borders with the Ottomans in Kurdistan and the Caucasus was of strategic importance to the Safavids. Hundreds of thousands of Kurds, along with large groups of Armenians, Assyrians, Azeris, and Turkmens, were forcibly removed from the border regions and resettled in the interior of Persia.That was a means of cutting off contact with other members of the groups across the borders as well as limiting passage of peoples. Under Tahmasp I the Safavids deported a huge portion of the Kurdish population in Anatolia to Khorasan, creating the modern Khorasani Kurds. Some Kurdish tribes were deported farther east, into Gharjistan in the Hindu Kush mountains of Afghanistan, about 1500 miles away from their former homes in western Kurdistan.

=== Ancient Assyria ===
The Jews were one of the many peoples forcibly mass deported by the Assyrians.

In the ancient world, population transfer was the more humane alternative to putting all the males of a conquered territory to death and enslaving the women and children. From the 13th century BCE, Assyria used mass deportation as a punishment for rebellions. By the 9th century BCE, the Assyrians regularly deported thousands of restless subjects to other lands. Assyria forcibly resettled the inhabitants of the Northern Kingdom of Israel in 720 BCE; these became known as the Ten Lost Tribes.

=== Indian subcontinent ===
Video of refugees on train roof during partition of India

When British India was going through an independence movement prior to the Second World War, some pro-Muslim organisations (most notably the Muslim League) demanded a Muslim state consisting of two non-contiguous territories: East Pakistan and West Pakistan. To facilitate the creation of new states along religious lines (as opposed to racial or linguistic lines as people shared common histories and languages), population exchanges between India and Pakistan were implemented. More than 5 million Hindus and Sikhs moved from present-day Pakistan to present-day India, and the same number of Muslims moved the other way. A large number of people, more than a million by some estimates, died in the accompanying violence. Despite the movement of large number of Muslims to Pakistan, an equal number of Muslims chose to stay in India. However, most of the Hindu and Sikh population in Pakistan moved to India in the following years. The Muslim immigrants to Pakistan mostly settled in Karachi and became known as the Urdu speaking Muhajir community.

From 1989 to 1992, the ethnic Hindu Kashmiri Pandit population was forcibly moved out of Kashmir by a minority Urdu-speaking Muslims. The imposition of Urdu led to a decline of usage of local languages such as Kashmiri and Dogri. The resultant violence led to the death of many Hindus and the exodus of nearly all Hindus.

On the Indian Ocean island of Diego Garcia between 1967 and 1973, the British government forcibly removed 2000 Chagossian islanders to make way for a U.S. Armed Forces base. Despite court judgments in their favour, they have not been allowed to return from their exile in Mauritius, but there are signs that financial compensation and an official apology are being considered by the British government.

=== Afghanistan ===
In the 1880s, Abdur Rahman Khan moved the rebellious Ghilzai Pashtuns from the southern part of the country to the northern part. In addition, Abdur Rahman and his successors encouraged Pashtuns, with various incentives, to settle into northern Afghanistan in the late 19th and 20th centuries.

=== Cambodia ===
One of the Khmer Rouge's first acts was to move most of the urban population into the countryside. Phnom Penh, its population of 2.5 million people including as many as 1.5 million wartime refugees living with relatives or in urban area, was soon nearly empty. Similar evacuations occurred at Battambang, Kampong Cham, Siem Reap, Kampong Thom and throughout the country's other towns and cities. The Khmer Rouge attempted to turn Cambodia into a classless society by depopulating cities and forcing the urban population ("New People") into agricultural communes. The entire population was forced to become farmers in labor camps.

=== Caucasia ===
In the Caucasian region of the former Soviet Union, ethnic population transfers have affected many thousands of individuals in Armenia, Nagorno-Karabakh and Azerbaijan proper; in Abkhazia, South Ossetia and Georgia proper and in Chechnya and adjacent areas within Russia.

=== Middle East ===
- During the Kurdish rebellions in Turkey from 1920 and until 1937, hundreds of thousands of Kurdish refugees were forced to relocate.
- After the creation of the State of Israel and the Israel Independence War, a strong wave of antisemitism in the Arab countries forced many Jews to flee to Europe, the Americas and Israel. The number estimated is between 850,000 and 1,000,000 people. Those who arrived to Israel were put in refugee camps until the state had helped them to recover.
- Up to 3,000,000 people, mainly Kurds, have been displaced in the Kurdish–Turkish conflict, an estimated 1,000,000 of which were still internally displaced as of 2009.
- For decades, Saddam Hussein forcibly Arabized northern Iraq. Sunni Arabs drove out at least 70,000 Kurds from western Mosul to replace them with Sunni Arabs. Now, only eastern Mosul is Kurdish.
- During the First Gulf War, a survey reported that 732,000 Yemeni immigrants were forced to leave Gulf Countries to return to Yemen. Most of them had been in Saudi Arabia.
- After the First Gulf War, Kuwaiti authorities expelled nearly 200,000 Palestinians from Kuwait. That was partly a response to the alignment of PLO leader Yasser Arafat with Saddam Hussein.
- In August 2005, Israel forcibly transferred all 10,000 Israeli settlers from the Gaza Strip and the north of the West Bank.
- About 6.5 million Syrian refugees moved within the country, and 4.3 million left for neighboring countries because of the Syrian Civil War. Many were displaced by the fighting, with forced expulsions taking place against both Sunni Arabs and Alawites.

== In Africa ==
=== Ethiopia ===
In the context of the 1983–1985 famine in Ethiopia thousands of people were resettled from northern to southern Ethiopia. The official reason given by the government was that people would be moved from the drought-affected northern regions to the south and south-west, where arable land was plentiful. Others argued that resettlement was a ploy to depopulate areas of unrest in the Ethiopian Civil War.

=== South Africa ===
African people from across southern Africa were forced to move into 'homelands' or Bantustan, which were territories that the white National Party administration of South Africa set aside for black inhabitants of South Africa and South West Africa (now Namibia), as part of its policy of apartheid.

=== Mozambique ===
When Syrah Resources started the Balama mine, an open pit mine for graphite in Cabo Delgado Province in 2015, farmers has to be resettled. By 2025, farmers grievances still remained unsettled leading to protests that eventually led Syrah Resources to suspend operations.

== See also ==
- Demographic engineering
- Deportation
- Development-induced displacement
- Diaspora
- Emigration
- Ethnic cleansing
- Exile
- Expulsions and exoduses of Jews
- Forced displacement
- Forced migration
- Genocide
- Immigration
- Internment of German Americans
- Internment of Italian Americans
- Kidnapping of children by Nazi Germany
- Political cleansing of population
- Political migration
- Population cleansing
- Refugee
- Replacement migration
- Third country resettlement
- Villagization
- Voluntary return
- World War II evacuation and expulsion
