= Democide =

Government-sanctioned killing

Democide, or populicide, is "the intentional killing of an unarmed or disarmed person by government agents acting in their authoritative capacity and pursuant to government policy or high command". The term democide, coined by Holocaust historian and statistics expert R. J. Rummel in his book Death by Government, has been described by Holocaust historian Yehuda Bauer as a better term than genocide to refer to certain types of mass killing. According to Rummel, this definition covers a wide range of deaths, including forced labor and concentration camp victims, extrajudicial summary killings, and mass deaths due to governmental acts of criminal omission and neglect, such as in deliberate famines like the Holodomor, as well as killings by de facto governments, such as killings during a civil war. This definition covers any murder of any number of persons by any government.

Rummel coined democide as an extended term to include forms of government murder not covered by genocide. According to Rummel, democide surpassed war as the leading cause of non-natural death in the 20th century.

== Definition ==
Democide is the murder of any person or people by their government (normally the one under whose jurisdiction they live), including genocide, politicide, and mass murder. Democide is not necessarily the elimination of entire cultural groups but rather groups within the country that the government feels need to be eradicated for political reasons and due to claimed future threats.

According to Rummel, genocide has three different meanings. The ordinary meaning is murder by government of people due to their national, ethnic, racial or religious group membership. The legal meaning of genocide refers to the international treaty on genocide, the Convention on the Prevention and Punishment of the Crime of Genocide. This also includes nonlethal acts that in the end eliminate or greatly hinder the group. Looking back on history, one can see the different variations of democides that have occurred, but it still consists of acts of killing or mass murder. The generalized meaning of genocide is similar to the ordinary meaning but also includes government killings of political opponents or otherwise intentional murder. In order to avoid confusion over which meaning is intended, Rummel created democide for this third meaning.

In "How Many Did Communist Regimes Murder?", Rummel wrote:

First, however, I should clarify the term democide. It means for governments what murder means for an individual under municipal law. It is the premeditated killing of a person in cold blood, or causing the death of a person through reckless and wanton disregard for their life. Thus, a government incarcerating people in a prison under such deadly conditions that they die in a few years is murder by the state—democide—as would parents letting a child die from malnutrition and exposure be murder. So would government forced labor that kills a person within months or a couple of years be murder. So would government created famines that then are ignored or knowingly aggravated by government action be murder of those who starve to death. And obviously, extrajudicial executions, death by torture, government massacres, and all genocidal killing be murder. However, judicial executions for crimes that internationally would be considered capital offenses, such as for murder or treason (as long as it is clear that these are not fabricated for the purpose of executing the accused, as in communist show trials), are not democide. Nor is democide the killing of enemy soldiers in combat or of armed rebels, nor of noncombatants as a result of military action against military targets.

In his work and research, Rummel distinguished between colonial, democratic, and authoritarian and totalitarian regimes. He defined totalitarianism as follows:

There is much confusion about what is meant by totalitarian in the literature, including the denial that such systems even exist. I define a totalitarian state as one with a system of government that is unlimited constitutionally or by countervailing powers in society (such as by a church, rural gentry, labor unions, or regional powers); is not held responsible to the public by periodic secret and competitive elections; and employs its unlimited power to control all aspects of society, including the family, religion, education, business, private property, and social relationships. Under Stalin, the Soviet Union was thus totalitarian, as was Mao's China, Pol Pot's Cambodia, Hitler's Germany, and U Ne Win's Burma. Totalitarianism is then a political ideology for which a totalitarian government is the agency for realizing its ends. Thus, totalitarianism characterizes such ideologies as state socialism (as in Burma), Marxism-Leninism as in former East Germany, and Nazism. Even revolutionary Moslem Iran since the overthrow of the Shah in 1978–79 has been totalitarian—here totalitarianism was married to Moslem fundamentalism. In short, totalitarianism is the ideology of absolute power. State socialism, communism, Nazism, fascism, and Moslem fundamentalism have been some of its recent raiments. Totalitarian governments have been its agency. The state, with its international legal sovereignty and independence, has been its base. As will be pointed out, mortacracy is the result.

== Estimates ==
In his estimates, Rudolph Rummel relied mostly on historical accounts, an approach that rarely provides accuracy compared with contemporary academic opinion. In the case of Mexican democide, Rummel wrote that while "these figures amount to little more than informed guesses", he thought "there is enough evidence to at least indict these authoritarian regimes for megamurder." According to Rummel, his research showed that the death toll from democide is far greater than the death toll from war. After studying over 8,000 reports of government-caused deaths, Rummel estimated that there have been 262 million victims of democide in the last century. According to his figures, six times as many people have died from the actions of people working for governments than have died in battle. One of his main findings was that democracies have much less democide than authoritarian regimes. Rummel argued that there is a relation between political power and democide. Political mass murder grows increasingly common as political power becomes unconstrained. At the other end of the scale, where power is diffuse, checked, and balanced, political violence is a rarity. According to Rummel, "[t]he more power a regime has, the more likely people will be killed. This is a major reason for promoting freedom." Rummel argued that "concentrated political power is the most dangerous thing on earth."

Rummel's estimates, especially about Communist democide, typically included a wide range and cannot be considered determinative. Rummel calculated nearly 43 million deaths due to democide inside and outside the Soviet Union during Stalin's regime. This is much higher than an often quoted figure in the popular press of 20 million, or a 2010s scholarly figure of 9 million. Rummel responded that the 20 million estimate is based on a figure from Robert Conquest's The Great Terror and that Conquest's qualifier "almost certainly too low" is usually forgotten. For Rummell, Conquest's calculations excluded camp deaths before 1936 and after 1950, executions (1939–1953), the forced population transfer in the Soviet Union (1939–1953), the deportation within the Soviet Union of minorities (1941–1944), and those the Soviet Red Army and Cheka (the secret police) executed throughout Eastern Europe after their conquest during the 1944–1945 period. Moreover, the Holodomor that killed 5 million in 1932–1934 (according to Rummel) is also not included. After decades of research in the state archives, most scholars say that Stalin's regime killed between 6 and 9 million, which is considerably less than originally thought, while Nazi Germany killed at least 11 million, which is in line with previous estimates.

=== Criticism of specific estimates ===
Edward J. M. Rhoads cited as inaccurate Rummel's description of the 1911 Revolution in China as a "very minor affair ... no more than 1,000 to 2,000 died," citing a death toll multiple times the number 2,000 among the Manchu ethnic minority. According to Sara M. Butler: "Rummel claims that 350,000 Jews were killed in the Spanish Inquisition, which is 1.7 times higher than the actual Jewish population of Spain at that time."

In historian William Rubinstein's opinion, almost all of Rummel's estimated numbers were false.

== Application ==
=== Authoritarian and totalitarian regimes ===
==== Communist regimes ====
Rummel applied the concept of democide to Communist regimes. In 1987, Rudolph Rummel's book Death by Government Rummel estimated that 148 million were killed by Communist governments from 1917 to 1987. The list of Communist countries with more than 1 million estimated victims included:

- China at 76,702,000 (1949–1987),
- the Soviet Union at 61,911,000 (1917–1987),
- Democratic Kampuchea (1975–1979) at 2,035,000,
- Vietnam (1945–1987) at 1,670,000,
- Poland (1945–1987) at 1,585,000,
- North Korea (1948–1987) at 1,563,000,
- Yugoslavia (1945–1987) at 1,072,000.

In 1993, Rummel wrote: "Even were we to have total access to all communist archives we still would not be able to calculate precisely how many the communists murdered. Consider that even in spite of the archival statistics and detailed reports of survivors, the best experts still disagree by over 40 percent on the total number of Jews killed by the Nazis. We cannot expect near this accuracy for the victims of communism. We can, however, get a probable order of magnitude and a relative approximation of these deaths within a most likely range." In 1994, Rummel updated his estimates for Communist regimes at about 110 million people, foreign and domestic, killed by Communist democide from 1900 to 1987. Due to additional information about Mao Zedong's culpability in the Great Chinese Famine according to Mao: The Unknown Story, a 2005 book authored by Jon Halliday and Jung Chang, Rummel revised upward his total for Communist democide to about 148 million, using their estimate of 38 million famine deaths.

Rummel's figures for Communist governments have been criticized for the methodology which he used to arrive at them, and they have also been criticized for being higher than the figures which have been given by most scholars

==== Right-wing authoritarian, fascist, and feudal regimes ====
Estimates by Rummel for fascist or right-wing authoritarian regimes include:

- Nazi Germany at 20,946,000 (1933–1945),
- Nationalist China (1925–1949) and later Taiwan (1949–1987) at 10,214,000,
- Empire of Japan at 5,964,000 (1900–1945).

Estimates for other regime-types include:

- the Ottoman Empire at 1,883,000 (Armenian genocide and Greek genocide),
- Pakistan at 1,503,000 (1971 Bangladesh genocide),
- Porfiriato in Mexico at somewhere between 600,000 and 3,000,000 and closer to 1,417,000 (1900–1920),
- the Russian Empire at 1,066,000 (1900–1917).

Democide in Communist and Nationalist China, Nazi Germany, and the Soviet Union are characterized by Rummel as deka-megamurderers (128,168,000), while those in Cambodia, Japan, Pakistan, Poland, Turkey, Vietnam, and Yugoslavia are characterized as the lesser megamurderers (19,178,000), and cases in Mexico, North Korea, and feudal Russia are characterized as suspected megamurderers (4,145,000). Rummel wrote that "even though the Nazis hardly matched the democide of the Soviets and Communist Chinese", they "proportionally killed more".

=== Colonial regimes ===
In response to David Stannard's figures about what he terms "the American Holocaust", Rummel estimated that over the centuries of European colonization about 2 million to 15 million American indigenous people were victims of democide, excluding military battles and unintentional deaths in Rummel's definition. Rummel wrote that "[e]ven if these figures are remotely true, then this still make this subjugation of the Americas one of the bloodier, centuries long, democides in world history."

- Rummel stated that his estimate for those killed by colonialism is 50,000,000 persons in the 20th century (this was revised upwards from his initial estimate of 815,000 dead).

=== Democratic regimes ===
While democratic regimes are considered by Rummel to be the least likely to commit democide and engage in wars per the democratic peace theory, Rummel wrote that

- "democracies themselves are responsible for some of this democide. Detailed estimates have yet to be made, but preliminarily work suggests that some 2,000,000 foreigners have been killed in cold blood by democracies."

Foreign policy and secret services of democratic regimes "may also carry on subversive activities in other states, support deadly coups, and actually encourage or support rebel or military forces that are involved in democidal activities. Such was done, for example, by the American CIA in the 1953 coup against Iran Prime Minister Mossadeq and the 1973 coup against Chile's democratically elected President Allende by General Pinochet. Then there was the secret support given the military in El Salvador and Guatemala although they were slaughtering thousands of presumed communist supporters, and that of the Contras in their war against the Sandinista government of Nicaragua in spite of their atrocities. Particularly reprehensible was the covert support given to the Generals in Indonesia as they murdered hundreds of thousands of communists and others after the alleged attempted communist coup in 1965, and the continued secret support given to General Agha Mohammed Yahya Khan of Pakistan even as he was involved in murdering over a million Bengalis in East Pakistan (now Bangladesh)."

According to Rummel, examples of democratic democide would include "those killed in indiscriminate or civilian targeted city bombing, as of Germany and Japan in World War II. It would include the large scale massacres of Filipinos during the bloody American colonization of the Philippines at the beginning of this century, deaths in British concentration camps in South Africa during the Boer War, civilian deaths due to starvation during the British blockade of Germany in and after World War I, the rape and murder of helpless Chinese in and around Peking in 1900, the atrocities committed by Americans in Vietnam, the murder of helpless Algerians during the Algerian War by the French, and the unnatural deaths of German prisoners of war in French and American POW camps after World War II."

== See also ==
- Anti-communist mass killings
- Classicide
- Comparison of Nazism and Stalinism
- Crimes against humanity
- Crimes against humanity under communist regimes
- Cultural genocide
- Environmental killings
- Ethnic cleansing
- Ethnic conflict
- Ethnocide
- Extrajudicial killing
- Extrajudicial punishment
- Genocide of indigenous peoples
- Genocides in history
- List of ethnic cleansing campaigns
- List of genocides
- Policide
- Population cleansing
- Political cleansing of population
- Pogrom
- Lynching
- Social cleansing
- Social murder
- Terrorism
- War crime
