= Classicide =

Intentional destruction of a social class

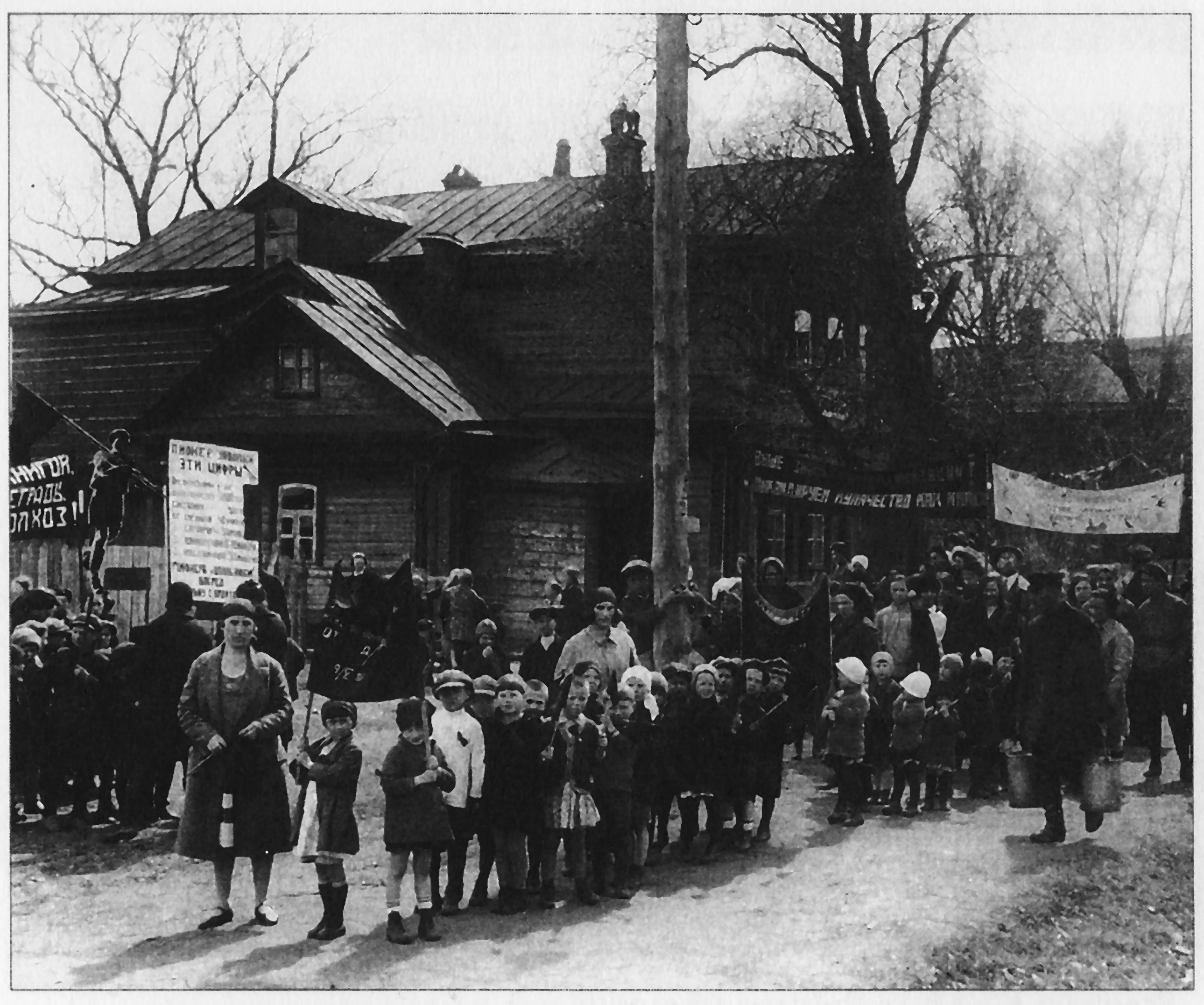
A Soviet parade between 1929 and 1934 under the banners "We will liquidate the kulaks as a class" and "All to the struggle against the wreckers of agriculture"

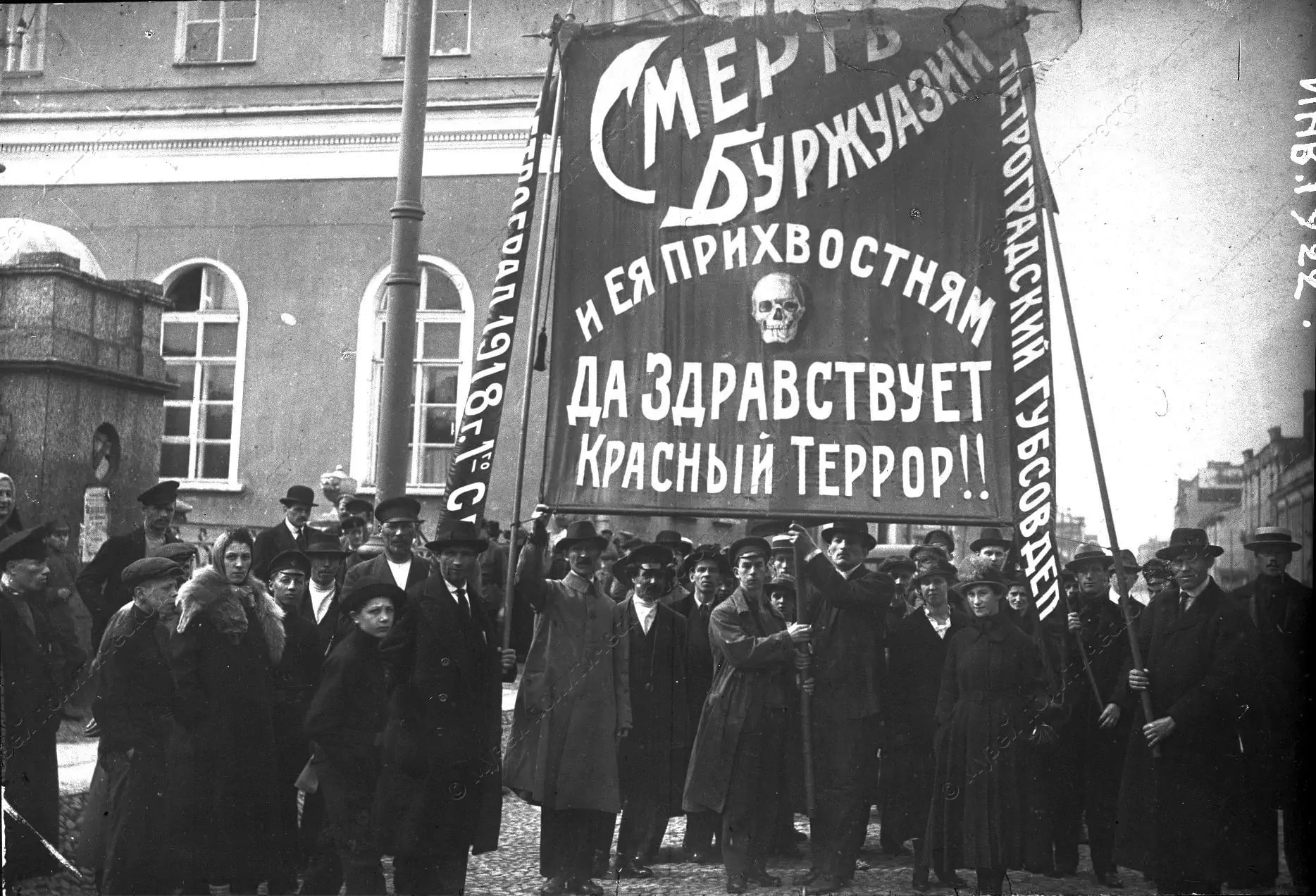
Bolsheviks in 1918 in Petrograd under a propaganda poster saying "Death to the bourgeoisie and its lapdogs – Long live the Red Terror!!"

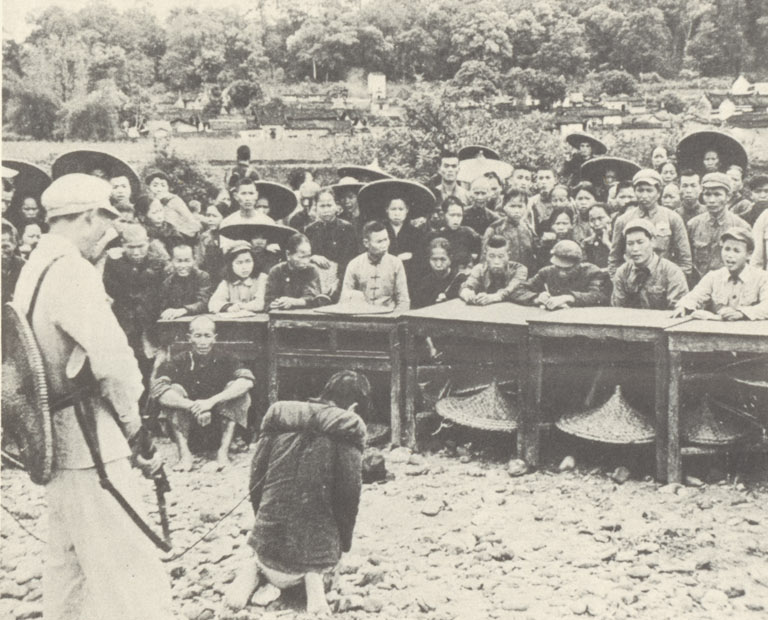
A wealthy farmer in front of a Chinese Communist "people's court" in Fogang County, Guangdong Province on July 23, 1952 during the Land Reform Movement, which saw the mass killings of landlords

Classicide is a concept proposed by sociologist Michael Mann to describe the deliberate and systematic destruction, in whole or in part, of a social class through persecution and violence. Although it was first used by physician and anti-communist activist Fred Schwarz in 1972, classicide was popularized by Mann as a term that is similar to but distinct from genocide because it means the "intended mass killing of entire social classes." Classicide is considered a form of "premeditated mass killing", which is narrower than genocide, because the target of a classicide is a part of a population which is defined by its social status, and classicide is also considered broader than politicide because the group which is targeted for classicide is killed without any concern for its political activities.

== Definition ==
The word classicide was first used by Schwarz in his 1972 book The Three Faces of Revolution. It was later used by Mann as a well-defined term. Since then, classicide has been used by some sociologists, such as Mann and Martin Shaw, to describe the unique forms of genocide which pertain to the annihilation of a class through murder or displacement and the destruction of the bourgeoisie to form an equal proletariat, although Mann does not use genocide in reference to examples under Communist states.

Political scientist Christophe Jaffrelot and historian Jacques Sémelin write that "Mann thus establishes a sort of parallel between racial enemies and class enemies, thereby contributing to the debates on comparisons between Nazism and communism. This theory has also been developed by some French historians such as Stéphane Courtois and Jean-Louis Margolin in The Black Book of Communism: they view class genocide as the equivalent to racial genocide. However, Mann refuses to use the term 'genocide' to describe the crimes which were committed under communism. He prefers to use the terms 'fratricide' and 'classicide', a word which he coined in reference to the intentional mass killings of entire social classes."

== Examples ==
According to Mann, examples of classicide include the dekulakization policy during the forced collectivization in the Soviet Union under the Stalin era of the better off peasants, who were labelled as kulaks and identified as "class enemies" by the Soviet regime, and the Cambodian genocide by the Khmer Rouge regime in Democratic Kampuchea, before being stopped by Vietnam. Mann said they were a perversion of socialist theories of democracy in the same sense as ethnic cleansing is a perversion of nationalist theory of democracy.

Human rights activist Harry Wu has identified the killings which were carried out during the Chinese Land Reform under the leadership of Mao Zedong as classicide. Wu writes that "in order to consolidate his power, Mao Zedong implemented a nation-wide ideology to undermine those who previously held power." According to Wu, this ideology included dividing people into five class categories depending on their possession of land, capital, property, and income. The five categories were the landlord class, the rich peasant class, the middle peasant class, and the poor worker and peasant classes. Those in the lower classes were "praised for their humble way of life and work ethic", while the landlords and the wealthy were demonized and persecuted. Their property was seized, and they were sent to do hard manual labor in the countryside where many of them were killed. Wu writes that "according to research, in 1949 there were around 10 to 15 million members of the landlord and rich peasant classes nationwide. By the end of the 1970s, when the Cultural Revolution had ended, only 10 to 15 percent of them remained alive."

== See also ==
- Class conflict
- Democide
- Eliticide
- Helots
- Life unworthy of life
- Social cleansing

== Bibliography ==
- Alvarez, Alex (2009). Genocidal Crimes (1st illustrated ed.). London, England: Routledge. ISBN 9781134035816 – via Google Books.
- Jaffrelot, Christophe; Sémelin, Jacques, eds. (2007). Purify and Destroy: The Political Uses of Massacre and Genocide. CERI Series in Comparative Politics and International Studies. Translated by Cynthia Schoch (hardback ed.). New York City, New York: Columbia University Press. ISBN 9780231142823 – via Google Books.
- Jones, Adam (2016) [2006]. Genocide: A Comprehensive Introduction (3rd ed.). London, England: Routledge. ISBN 9781317533863 – via Google Books.
- Mann, Michael (2005). The Dark Side of Democracy: Explaining Ethnic Cleansing (paperback ed.). New York City, New York: Cambridge University Press. ISBN 9780521538541 – via Google Books.
- Mann, Michael (Spring 2002). Explaining Murderous Ethnic Cleansing: Eight Theses (PDF) (Paper prepared for the International Sociological Association Conference, Brisbane, Australia, July 2002). Brisbane, Australia: University of California, Los Angeles. Archived from the original (PDF) on May 21, 2003 – via UCLA.
- Mann, Michael (2012). The Sources of Social Power: Volume 4, Globalizations, 1945–2011. New York City, New York: Cambridge University Press. ISBN 9781107311220 – via Google Books.
- Sangar, Eric (3 November 2007). "Classicide". Online Encyclopedia of Mass Violence – via Sciences Po.
- Schwarz, Fred (1972). The Three Faces of Revolution (hardcover ed.). Washington, D.C.: Capitol Hill Press. ISBN 9780882210032 – via Google Books.
- Shaw, Martin (2015). What is Genocide? (1st ed.). Hoboken, New Jersey: John Wiley & Sons. ISBN 9780745631837 – via Google Books.
- Wu, Harry (1 December 2012). "Classicide in Communist China". Comparative Civilizations Review. 67 (Fall 2012). Salzburg, Austria: International Society for the Comparative Study of Civilizations: 101–106. doi:10.5840/jis2006181/27 – via BYU ScholarsArchive.
- Wu, Harry (1 July 2006). "Classicide – Genocide in Communist China". Journal of Interdisciplinary Studies. 18 (1/2). Huntington, West Virginia: Institute for Interdisciplinary Research: 121–135. doi:10.5840/jis2006181/27.
