= War in Abkhazia =

War in Abkhazia may refer to these wars in Abkhazia:

- War in Abkhazia (1992–1993), when Abkhazia de-facto separated from Georgia after the dissolution of the Soviet Union and Georgian independence

== See also ==
- Abkhazia conflict (1989–present), the ongoing conflict between Abkhaz separatists and Georgia
