= Political cleansing of population =

Eliminating groups of people for political reasons

Political cleansing of a population is the elimination of categories of people in specific areas for political reasons. The means of it may vary and they may include acts of political violence, ethnic cleansing, forced migration, genocide, political repression, purges, population transfers and terrorism (especially state terrorism and state-sponsored terrorism). Political cleansing has been used by many dictatorships.

== Genocide Convention ==
Under the Genocide Convention, political groups are not a protected group if they are targeted with an intent to destroy the political group even if they share an ethnic, national or religious identity.

Protection of political groups was eliminated from the United Nations resolution after a second vote because many states, including Stalin's Soviet Union, anticipated that clause to apply unneeded limitations to their right to suppress internal disturbances. The reason given was that the protected groups were immutable, which scholars point out is unlikely, since religious and national affiliation are not immutable.

Efforts to have political groups added to the Convention have been unsuccessful.

Scholarly study of genocide usually acknowledges the United Nations omission of economic and political groups, and uses mass political killing datasets of democide, and genocide and politicide, or geno-politicide. Killings by the Khmer Rouge in Democratic Kampuchea have been labelled genocide or autogenocide, and the deaths under Leninism and Stalinism in the Soviet Union, and Maoism in Communist China have been controversially investigated as possible cases; the Soviet famine of 1932–1933 and the Great Chinese Famine during the Great Leap Forward have been controversially "depicted as instances of mass killing underpinned by genocidal intent". In addition, the Bodo League massacres, which constituted the mass murder of between 60,000 and 200,000 alleged communists and communist-sympathizers by the Republic of Korea Armed Forces during the Korean War is considered by some scholars as genocide. The massacres of Indonesian communists, that caused between 500,000 and 3 million deaths, are also considered by many as a genocide.

== Politicide ==
Politicide is the deliberate physical destruction or elimination of a group whose members oppose a regime or share the main characteristic of belonging to a political movement. It is a type of political repression and one of the means used to politically cleanse populations, another being forced migration. It may be compared to genocide or ethnic cleansing, both of which involve the killing of people based on their membership in a particular racial or ethnic group rather than their adherence to a particular ideology.

Politicide is used to describe the killing of groups that are not covered by the Genocide Convention. Social scientists Ted Robert Gurr and Barbara Harff use politicide to describe the killing of groups of people who are targeted not because of their shared ethnic or communal traits, but because of "their hierarchical position or political opposition to the regime and dominant groups." Harff studies genocide and politicide, sometimes shortened as geno-politicide, in order to include the killing of political, economic, ethnic and cultural groups. Manus Midlarsky uses politicide to describe an arc of large-scale killing from the western parts of the Soviet Union to China and Cambodia. In his book The Killing Trap: Genocide in the Twentieth Century, Midlarsky raises similarities between the killings perpetrated by Joseph Stalin and Pol Pot.

== Motives ==
Some groups attempt to eliminate the base of support for political opponents such as insurgents. This happens in many countries with high levels of insurgency such as Colombia. It may be a means for and referred to as pacification.

== See also ==
- Anti-communist mass killings
- Classicide
- Domicide
- Reign of Terror
- Death squads
- Desaparecidos
- Extrajudicial killing
- Forced settlements in the Soviet Union
- Human rights violations in Pinochet's Chile
- Hundred Flowers Campaign
- Mass killings under communist regimes
- Political violence
- Population transfer in the Soviet Union
- Purge
- Replacement migration
- Settler colonialism
- Terrorism
- Genocide studies
- Ethnic cleansing
