= House demolition (disambiguation) =

House demolition may refer to:

- Demolition of residences: removal of residences for purposes such as rebuilding or infill development
- House demolition (military): destruction of residences for purposes such as warfare or collective punishment
