= Dehousing =

British strategic bombing campaign against Germany during WWII

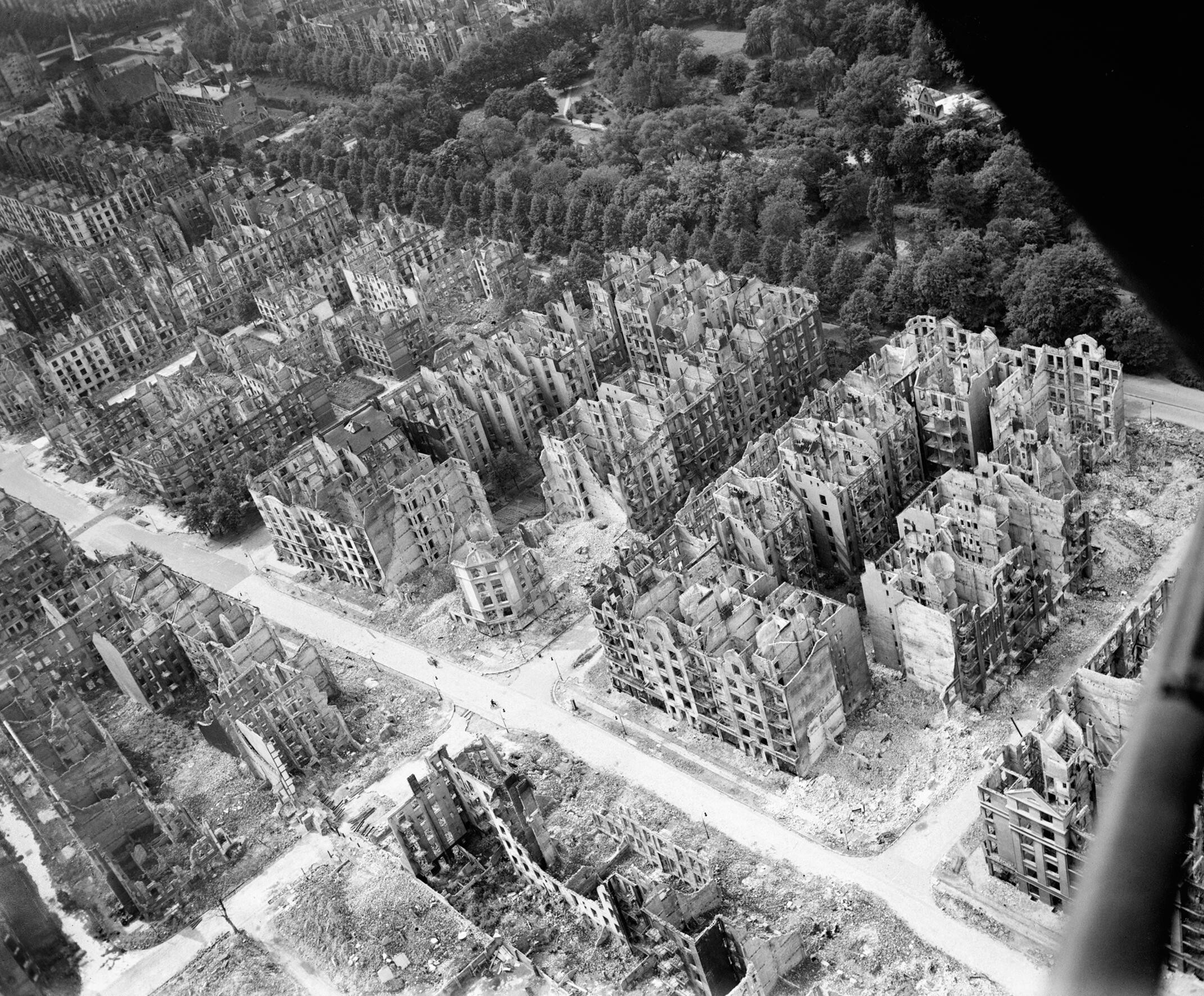
Bomb damage in the Eilbek district of Hamburg in 1944 or 1945. Dehousing posited that such damage to civilian housing would pressure Nazi Germany to surrender.

Dehousing was a military strategy adopted by the United Kingdom against Nazi Germany during World War II from 1942 to 1945. It sought to maximize the damage to civilian housing in Germany's largest cities during Royal Air Force raids as part of a demoralisation campaign against the German public.

The Dehousing strategy was proposed via a memorandum on 30 March 1942, by Professor Frederick Lindemann, Baron Cherwell, the British government's chief scientific adviser who believed that this strategy would allow them to avoid an invasion of Europe. Documentation on the strategy based on the effects of the Area bombing directive issued in February 1942, after it was accepted by the Churchill War Cabinet, became known as the dehousing paper. (Note: Also known as the "dehousing memorandum", the "Lindemann memorandum/paper", and the "Cherwell memorandum/paper" (he was ennobled in 1956))

== Context ==
The dehousing paper was delivered during a debate within the British government about the most effective use of the nation's resources in waging war on Germany: whether the Royal Air Force (RAF) should be reduced to allow more resources to go to the British Army and Royal Navy, or the strategic bombing option should be followed and expanded. The paper argued that from the analysis of the reaction of the British population to the Blitz, the demolition of people's houses was the most effective way to affect their morale, even more than the killing of relatives. The known limits of the RAF in locating targets in Germany and in providing the planned resources to be available to the RAF made destroying about 30% of the housing stock of Germany's 58 largest cities the most effective use of the aircraft of RAF Bomber Command by breaking the Germans' spirit. After a heated debate by the government's military and scientific advisers, the Cabinet chose the strategic bombing campaign over all other options.

== Production and contents of dehousing paper ==
The dehousing paper came while Bomber Command was in an enforced period of much reduced bombing since the winter of 1941/1942. The Butt Report had shown that bombing results were poor, and with the attrition rate it had been suffering in operations, the effort that had been expended gave a poor return. Since November 1941, the RAF had been husbanding its resources and awaiting the introduction of large numbers of four-engined heavy bombers (Note: The Short Stirling was the RAF's first "heavy" in early 1941, followed by the Handley Page Halifax later in 1941 and the Avro Lancaster entered service in mid-1942) and the GEE radio-navigational device into frontline service. The bombing policy had already moved away from attempts at precision bombing.

The paper was produced by Cherwell by using an analysis of recent raids on British cities that were being undertaken. The information was given by the researchers in response to questions posed by Cherwell.

The following seems a simple method of estimating what we could do by bombing Germany.

Careful analysis of the effects of raids on Birmingham, Hull and elsewhere have shown that, on the average, one ton of bombs dropped on a built-up area demolishes 20–40 dwellings and turns 100–200 people out of house and home.

We know from our experience that we can count on nearly fourteen operational sorties per bomber produced. The average lift of the bombers we are going to produce over the next fifteen months will be about 3 tons. It follows that each of these bombers will in its life-time drop about 40 tons of bombs. If these are dropped on built-up areas they will make 4000–8000 people homeless.

In 1938 over 22 million Germans lived in fifty-eight towns of over 100,000 inhabitants, which, with modern equipment, should be easy to find and hit. Our forecast output of heavy bombers (including Wellingtons) between now and the middle of 1943 is about 10,000. If even half the total load of 10,000 bombers were dropped on the built-up areas of these fifty-eight German towns the great majority of their inhabitants (about one-third of the German population) would be turned out of house and home.

Investigation seems to show that having one's home demolished is most damaging to morale. People seem to mind it more than having their friends or even relatives killed. At Hull signs of strain were evident, though only one-tenth of the houses were demolished. On the above figures we should be able to do ten times as much harm to each of the fifty-eight principal German towns. There seems little doubt that this would break the spirit of the people.

Our calculation assumes, of course, that we really get one-half of our bombs into built-up areas. On the other hand, no account is taken of the large promised American production (6,000 heavy bombers in the period in question). Nor has regard been paid to the inevitable damage to factories, communications, etc., in these towns and the damage by fire, probably accentuated by breakdown of public services.

== Contemporary debate and Butt and Singleton reports ==
The dehousing paper had been delivered to Prime Minister Winston Churchill at a time of mounting criticism about the RAF Bomber offensive. Criticism was coming from other branches inside the War Ministry and was becoming public.

It had started with a report initiated by Cherwell and delivered on 18 August 1941 by D. M. Bensusan-Butt, a member of the War Cabinet Secretariat. (Note: Bensusan-Butt had been private secretary to Cherwell and part of an Admiralty statistical section under Churchill.) The report based on analysis of aerial photographs concluded that less than a third of sorties flown had gotten within 5 miles (8.0 km) of the target. As Bensusan-Butt did not include aircraft that did not bomb because of equipment failure, enemy action, weather or getting lost, the reality was that about 5% of bombers setting out bombed within five miles of their target.

Senior RAF commanders argued that the Butt report's statistics were faulty and commissioned another report, which was delivered by the Directorate of Bombing Operations on 22 September 1941. Working from a damage analysis inflicted on British cities, a bomber force of 4,000 aircraft was calculated to be able to destroy the 43 German towns with a population of more than 100,000. The Chief of the Air Staff, Sir Charles Portal argued that with such a force RAF Bomber Command could win the war in six months. Not all were convinced, and when Churchill expressed his doubts, the Air Staff said that even if Germany was not knocked out of the war, it would be weakened sufficiently to allow British armed forces back into Continental Europe. With that compromise between the armed services, Bomber Command was allowed to keep its planned allocation of war materiel. That did not stop those outside the Chiefs of Staff from questioning the strategic bombing policy.

A particularly-damning speech had been delivered in the British House of Commons by the Member of Parliament for the University of Cambridge, Professor A. V. Hill (Note: Hill had worked with Blackett and Tizard before the war.) who pointed out, "The total [British] casualties in air-raids – in killed – since the beginning of the war are only two-thirds of those we lost as prisoners of war at Singapore.... The loss of production in the worst month of the Blitz was about equal to that due to the Easter holidays.... The Air Ministry have been... too optimistic.... We know most of the bombs we drop hit nothing of importance". Thus, the Secretary of State for Air, Sir Archibald Sinclair and Sir Charles Portal were delighted by the dehousing paper, as it offered support to them in their battle to save the strategic bomber offensive, which had been under attack from others in the high command, who thought that the resources put into Bomber Command were damaging the other branches of the armed services with little to show for it. Portal and Sinclair still expressed their reservations that it could be met.

On reading the dehousing paper, Professor Patrick Blackett, the newly-appointed civilian Director of Naval Operational Research, (Note: Blackett had until January been carrying out Operational Research for RAF Coastal Command in its battle against German U-boats.) wrote that the paper overestimated what could be achieved by 600%. The principal advocate for the reduction of RAF Bomber Command in favour of other options was Sir Henry Tizard. He argued that the only benefit to strategic bombing was to tie up enemy resources defending Germany and that they could be tied up with a far smaller bombing offensive. He wrote to Cherwell on 15 April to query the facts in the paper and warned that the War Cabinet could reach the wrong decision if it based it on the paper. Tizard had several doubts: that the stated bomber force could be achieved with only 7,000 bombers, not the 10,000 expected; that new navigational aids that would get the aircraft to the targets would not be ready before 1943; and that it was unlikely that more than 25% of the bombs would land on target. As such, the strategy would not work with the resources available, and a far larger effort would be required. In reply to Tizard, Cherwell stated the calculations were for the Prime Minister's benefit, not for statistical analysis, and that despite a difference between the numbers and what was really achieved, there would be catastrophic effects. In his Bomber Command, Max Hastings characterised the debate between the two sides as not being whether bombing could "raze [Germany] to the ground" but whether it was the most effective allocation of resources.

Mr. Justice Singleton, a High Court judge, was asked by the Cabinet to look into the competing points of view. In his report, delivered on 20 May 1942 he concluded:

If Russia can hold Germany on land I doubt whether Germany will stand 12 or 18 months' continuous, intensified and increased bombing, affecting, as it must, her war production, her power of resistance, her industries and her will to resist (by which I mean morale).

In the end, thanks in part to the dehousing paper, this view prevailed, but C. P. Snow (later Lord Snow) wrote that the debate became quite vitriolic, with Tizard being called a defeatist. It was while the debate about bombing was raging inside the British military establishment that the area bombing directive of 14 February 1942 was issued, and eight days later, Arthur "Bomber" Harris took up the post of Air Officer Commanding (AOC) of Bomber Command.

The study of the effects of bombing on Hull and Birmingham was published on 8 April by Professors Bernal and Zuckerman after Cherwell's paper had been presented. Their work, the "Hull and Birmingham Survey", had actually found that although there was anxiety as a result of the raids, there was no mass anti-social behaviour and "no measurable effect on the health of either town".

== See also ==
- Domicide
- Urbicide

== Sources ==
- Copp, Terry (September–October 1996). "The Bomber Command Offensive". Legion Magazine. Archived from the original on 2013-05-22.
- Longmate, Norman (1983). The Bombers: The RAF offensive against Germany 1939-1945. Hutchinson. ISBN 0-09-151580-7.
- Hastings, Max (1999). Bomber Command. Pan Books. ISBN 978-0-330-39204-4.
- Kirby, M. W. (2003). Operational research in war and peace: the British experience from the 1930s to 1970 (illustrated ed.). Imperial College Press. pp. 139, 140. ISBN 978-1-86094-366-9.
