= House demolition (military) =

Military tactic

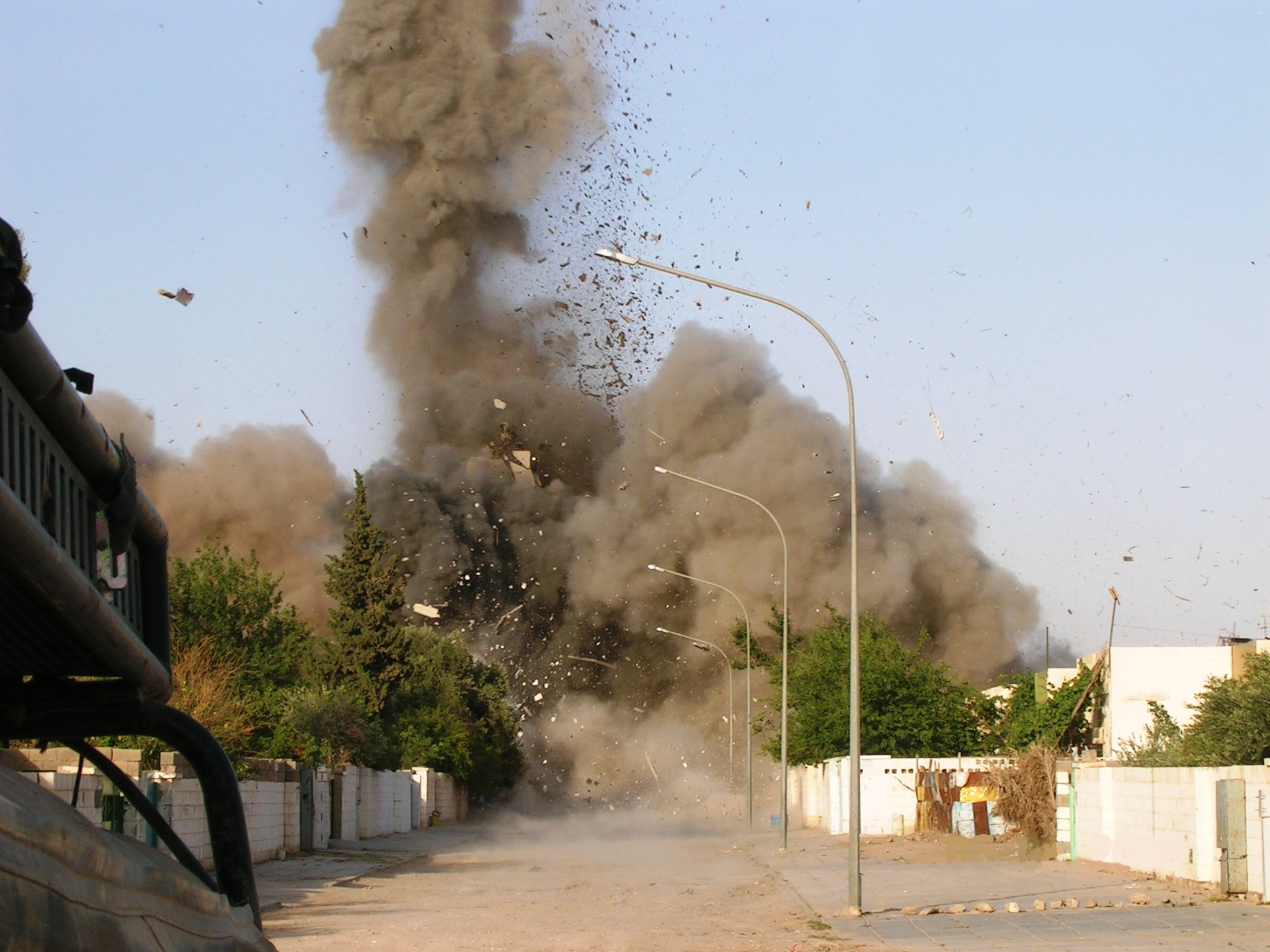
Demolition of a house in Iraq containing a weapons cache

House demolition is primarily a military tactic which has been used in many conflicts for a variety of purposes. It has been employed as a scorched earth tactic to deprive the advancing enemy of food and shelter, or to wreck the enemy's economy and infrastructure. It has also been used for purposes of counter-insurgency and ethnic cleansing. Systematic house demolition has been a notable factor in a number of recent or ongoing conflicts including the Darfur conflict in Sudan, the Iraq War, the Israeli–Palestinian conflict, the Vietnam War, and the Yugoslav wars.

The tactic has often been extremely controversial. Its use in warfare is governed by the Fourth Geneva Convention and other instruments of international law, and international war crimes courts have prosecuted the misuse of house demolition on a number of occasions as a violation of the laws of war. Historically, it has also been widely used by a variety of states and peoples as a civil punishment for criminal offences ranging from treason to public intoxication.

== Uses ==
=== Military uses ===
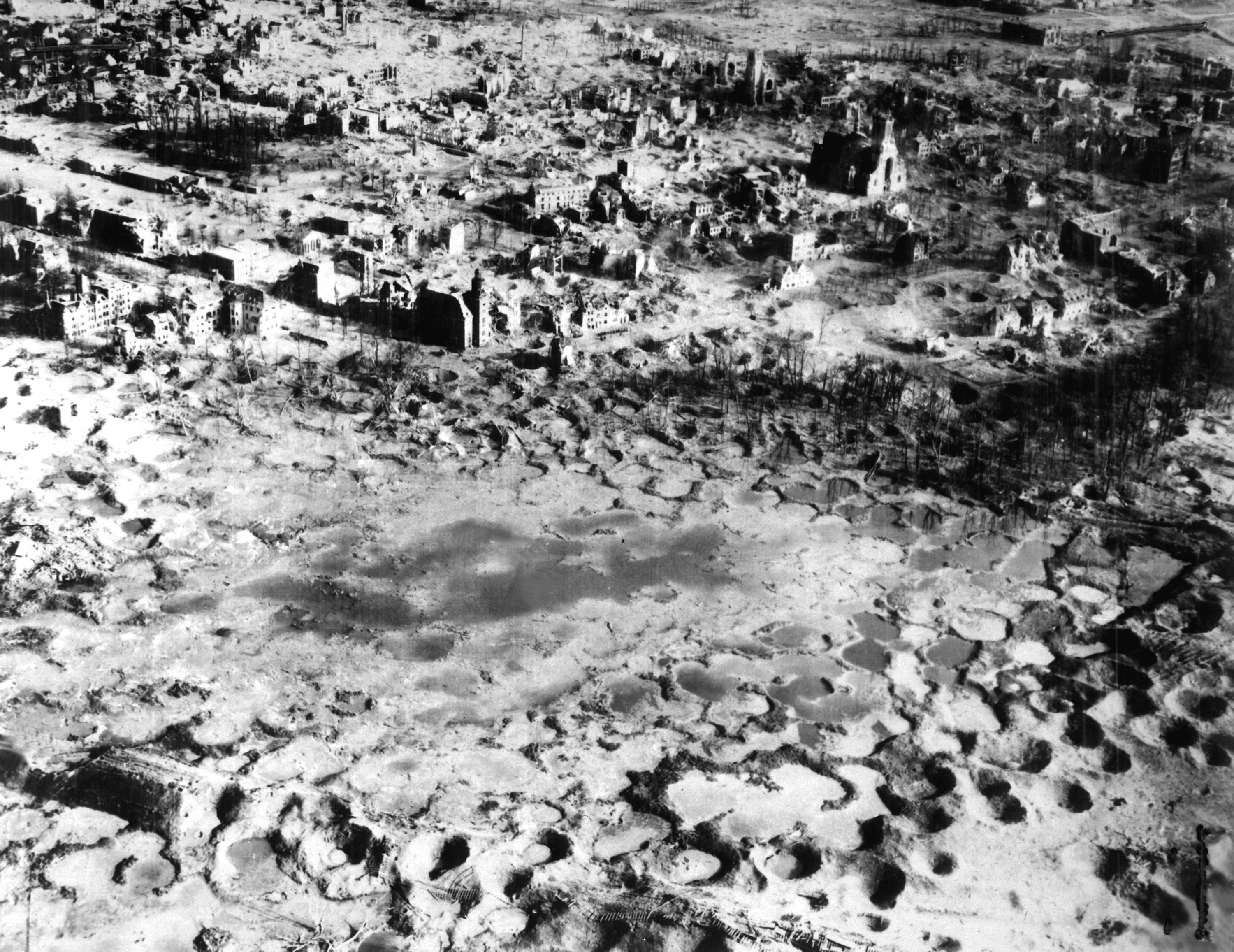
97% of Wesel was destroyed before it was finally taken by Allied troops.

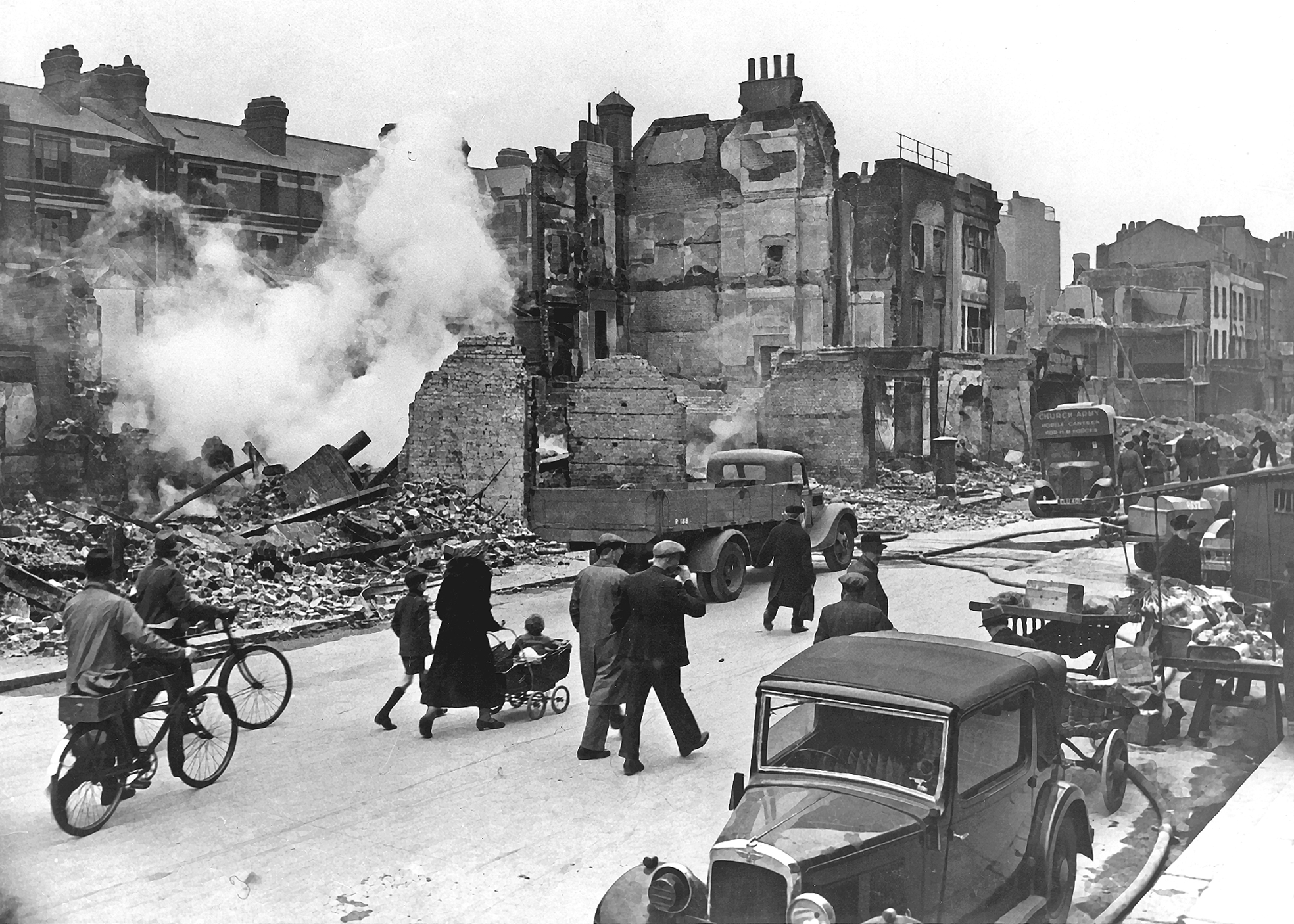
Bombed buildings in London.

A distinction needs to be made between the destruction of houses as an incidental effect of military necessity, the wanton destruction of houses during a military advance, and the deliberate targeting of houses during a military occupation. In the former case, it is commonplace for civilian homes to be used by armed forces as places of shelter or as firing positions. As a result, civilian dwellings become a legitimate military target and property damage is often inevitable as forces seek to expel their opponents from buildings. This can result in the destruction of houses on a massive scale as a side-effect of urban warfare. Following World War II, for instance, the United States occupation authorities in Germany found that 81 percent of all houses in the American Zone had been destroyed or damaged in the fighting.

The question of under what circumstances the destruction of civilian dwellings becomes a legitimate military tactic remains controversial, and recent international conventions have agreed that civilian houses, dwellings, and installations shall not be made the object of attack, except if they are used mainly in support of the military effort.

However, there are also many non-combat situations in which house demolition has been used. It has served a variety of purposes, depending on the nature and context of the conflict.

==== Scorched earth ====
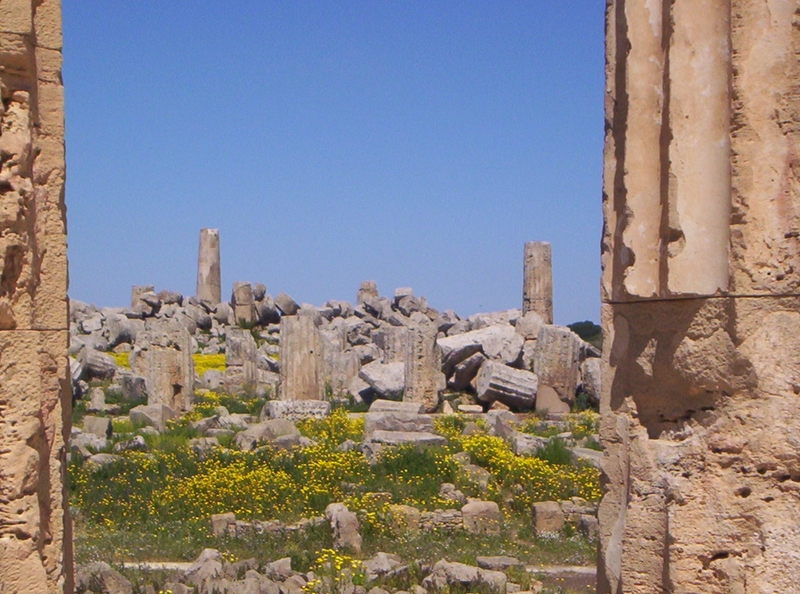
The ruins of Selinus, razed by Carthage around 250 BC

As a strictly military tactic, house demolition is useful as a defensive means of denying supplies and shelter to an enemy or, when used as an offensive measure, to break an enemy's power by destroying his economy and dispersing his population. It has been used both defensively and offensively in numerous conflicts throughout history. In classical antiquity, there were frequent examples of cities being razed in order to destroy individual city-states. Notably, Xerxes I of Persia razed Athens in 480 BC during the Greco-Persian Wars; Carthage razed Selinus in modern Sicily around 250 BC; and in turn, Carthage was itself utterly destroyed by Rome in 146 BC, ending the Punic Wars. In many instances (Selinus and Carthage being cases in point) the city's inhabitants were enslaved and not permitted to return to their destroyed homes.

In more recent times, the burning of homes was used to devastating effect in the War of the Grand Alliance in the 17th century, during which Louis XIV of France ordered the systematic destruction of the German cities of Bingen, Heidelberg, Mannheim, Oppenheim, Spier and Worms (while sparing the cathedrals). Germany had suffered even more extensively in the earlier Thirty Years' War, in which as much as two-thirds of German real estate is estimated to have been destroyed and reconstruction took as long as fifty years. During the American Civil War, the burning of Atlanta, Georgia and Sherman's March to the Sea in 1864 provided large-scale examples of the use of house demolition as a means of wrecking the enemy's economy.

In World War II, civilian homes were deliberately destroyed on a massive scale, particularly on the Eastern Front following the orders of Soviet premier Joseph Stalin to raze houses, farms and fields to deny their use to the advancing forces of Nazi Germany. Belarus was one of the worst affected regions, suffering the systematic destruction of about 75% of urban housing and many villages. Both sides also engaged in the deliberate large-scale targeting of civilian homes in their respective strategic bombing campaigns. The Germans repeatedly carried out indiscriminate bombing attacks against civilian areas, such as the bombing of Belgrade in 1941 and the Baedeker Blitz against England in 1942, and the Allies sought to demoralize the German workforce through the destruction of their homes—a policy known euphemistically as dehousing. Around 25% of Germany's housing stock was destroyed or heavily damaged in the subsequent Allied bombing campaigns, with some cities suffering the loss of up to 97% of civilian homes.

==== Ethnic cleansing ====
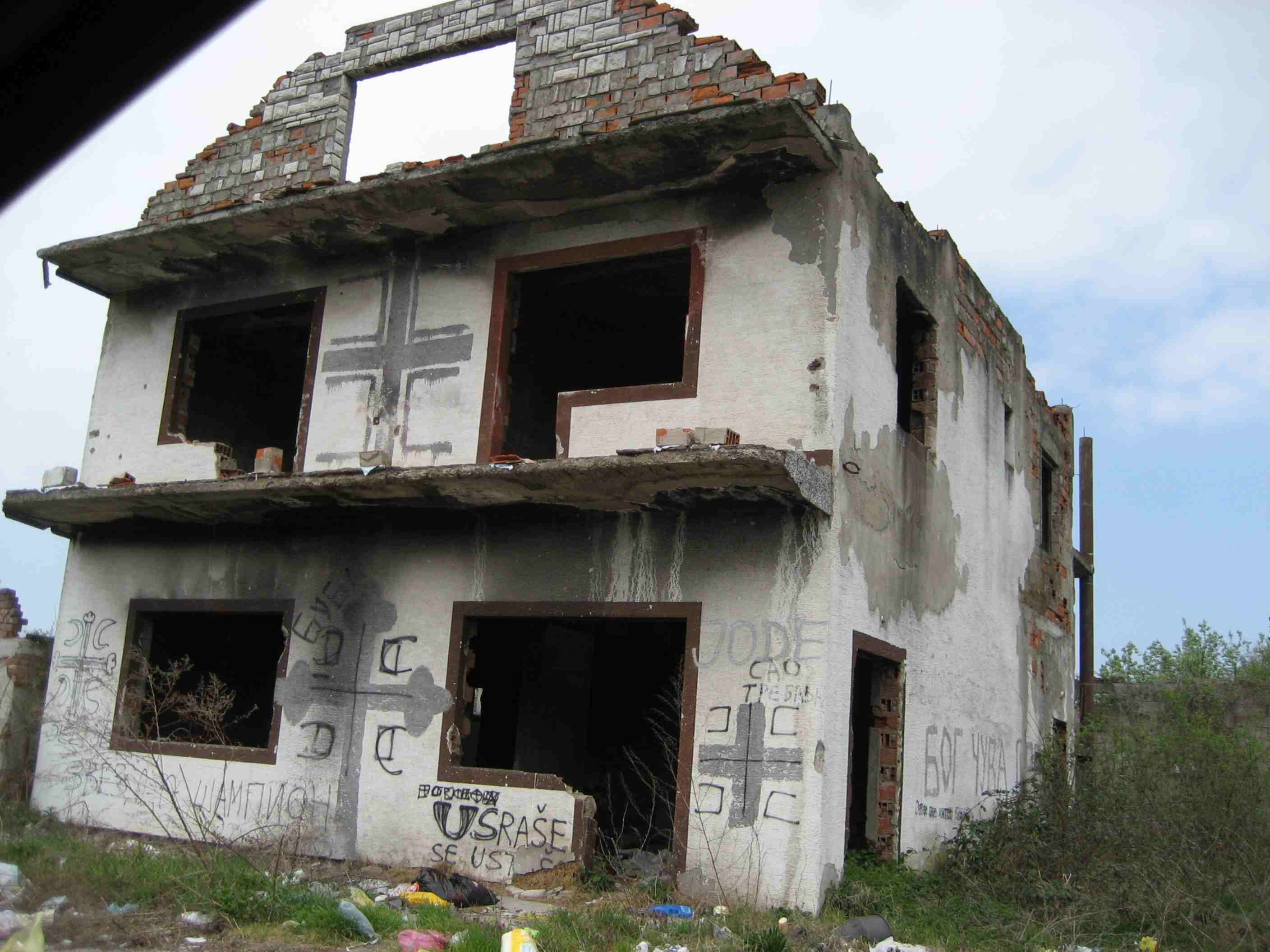
A destroyed house in Croatia marked with Serbian nationalist symbols and graffiti

In the former Yugoslavia, the tactic of home demolition was used by all sides in the conflict as a means of ethnic cleansing to change the ethnic composition of particular areas. It had particularly devastating effects in the rural areas of Bosnia, Croatia and Kosovo where the tactic was most prevalent, because the building of new homes was a life project for which families worked for many years. A house often symbolized the social worth of a family, demonstrating its hard work, commitment to future well-being and standing in the community. The systematic burning of homes was therefore deliberately intended to impoverish the home owners, reduce their social status and permanently prevent them from returning to their places of origins. By the end of the Bosnian War in 1995, over 60% of the country's housing stock had been destroyed.

Similar tactics have been used in a variety of other ethnic conflicts. During the 1948 Arab–Israeli War, there were a number of major incidents of the deliberate destruction of Arab villages by Israeli forces. The Israeli historian Benny Morris writes that in the later stages of the 1948 war, "[Israeli] commanders were clearly bent on driving out the population in the area they were conquering".

The inhabitants of Iraqi Kurdistan experienced one of the more extreme recent examples of the mass use of home demolitions to expedite ethnic cleansing during the Al-Anfal Campaign of 1986–1989. The campaign was mounted ostensibly to eliminate the peshmerga rebels of northern Iraq but quickly acquired a genocidal character. The Kurdish opposition estimated that of the approximately 5,000 villages existing in Iraqi Kurdistan in 1975, 3,479 had been deliberately destroyed by 1988. Upwards of 100,000 Kurds were killed and tens of thousands more fled Iraq to escape the campaign. Saddam Hussein's government adopted a policy of "Arabization" in which it systematically replaced the displaced Kurds with Iraqi Arabs in strategic areas such as Kirkuk.

In the conflicts in Abkhazia, North Ossetia and South Ossetia during the early 1990s, scores of villages were destroyed in a systematic effort to expel the native Georgian and Ingush populations from those regions. In Darfur, the Janjaweed militia has made house demolition a central part of its strategy to expel the population of the region, causing 2.5 million people to be displaced as of October 2006.

==== Counter-insurgency and collective punishment ====
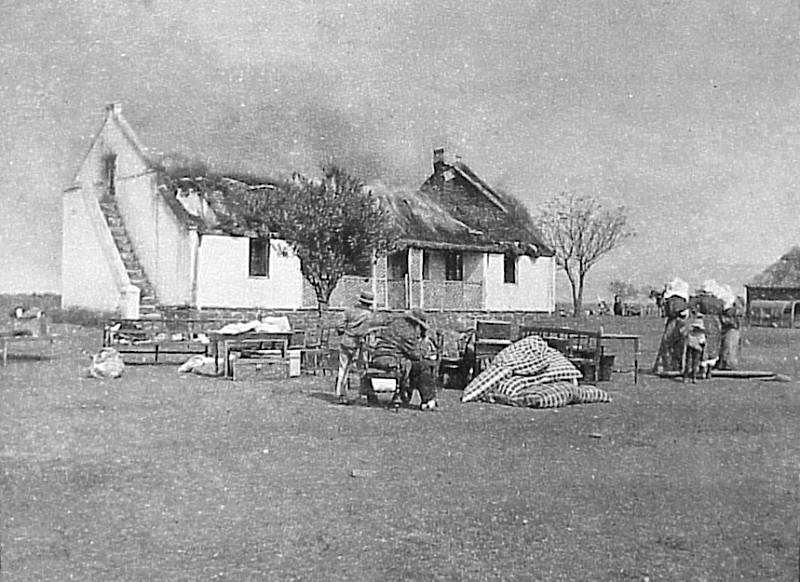
Boers watching their home being burnt by British forces during the Second Boer War

Governments facing insurgencies have often used home demolition as a counterinsurgency technique, as a means of eroding popular support for guerrillas and denying insurgents the use of villages as "safe havens". Mao Zedong, leader of the insurgent Chinese Communist Party during the Chinese Civil War, famously observed that "The guerrilla must move amongst the people as a fish swims in the sea." Mao advocated the forced migration of large populations of civilians by means of house demolition to "drain the sea" and deprive insurgents of cover.

This principle was, however, widely recognized well before it was encapsulated in Mao's famous dictum. William the Conqueror engaged in the harrying of the North from 1069 to 1070, during which Norman troops under his command systematically laid waste to rebellious areas in Northern England, can be considered an early example of the use of house demolitions to deprive enemy forces of civilian support. Similarly, during the Second Boer War, British forces under Lord Kitchener systematically destroyed Boer-owned farmsteads in order to prevent them from supplying food and equipment to Boer guerrillas still active in the field. Comparable tactics were used by the United States military during the Philippine–American War and again during the Vietnam War, when numerous villages were burned by U.S. troops and local allies. General Colin Powell later recalled how he had personally participated in the destruction of Montagnard homes when he was serving in Vietnam as a U.S. Army officer:

We burned down the thatched huts, starting the blaze with Ronson and Zippo lighters. Why were we torching houses and destroying crops? Ho Chi Minh had said the people were like the sea in which his guerrillas swam.... We tried to solve the problem by making the whole sea uninhabitable. In the hard logic of war, what difference did it make if you shot your enemy or starved him to death?"

Soviet forces used home destruction tactics indiscriminately during the Soviet–Afghan War when it sought to depopulate the countryside by attacking civilians in the villages in which they lived. Soviet troops would seize a settlement, expel the villagers and raze homes and other buildings before withdrawing. Sometimes the Soviets simply carpet-bombed villages to destroy them outright.

Similar depopulation tactics were adopted by Turkey in the 1980s and 1990s to combat the rebellion of the Marxist Kurdistan Workers Party in the Kurdish-populated parts of southeastern Turkey, known unofficially as Turkish Kurdistan. About 3,000 villages are estimated to have been destroyed during the Kurdish insurrection. In a high-profile case brought before the European Court of Human Rights by a group of Kurdish villagers in 2002, the Turkish government was found guilty of violations of the right to private and family life and the right to peaceful enjoyment of possessions. The court ordered the Turkish government to pay the applicants pecuniary damages for destruction of the houses and cost of alternative accommodations. It found that the several cases brought before it were but "a small sample of a much wider pattern" of house destruction employed by the Turkish government.

Home demolition has also been used—sometimes in conjunction with mass killings—as a form of collective punishment to penalise civilians for guerrilla activities. From the late 19th to the mid-20th century, this was a frequently used and highly controversial tactic employed by the German armed forces to counter the activities of guerrillas behind their front lines. It was used in the Franco-Prussian War of 1870–71 during the German occupation of France, when the Germans were faced with attacks by francs-tireurs, who were regarded explicitly as unlawful combatants. Mayors of occupied villages were ordered to report francs-tireurs operating in their districts or have their houses burned down. When francs-tireurs did attack, homes and entire villages were destroyed by the Germans in retaliation. Following the war, the Germans officially endorsed the use of house demolition as one of a number of forms of collective punishment in the Kriegs-Etappen-Ordnung, the manual for the rear echelons, even though this violated international law at the time.

The tactic was used to devastating effect by the Imperial German Army during the Herero and Namaqua Genocide in German South-West Africa, in which an estimated 75,000-100,000 Africans were killed. It was used again during World War I in a wave of systematic violence in occupied France and Belgium in August and September 1914, prompted in part by a fear of a civilian uprising and possible resistance by francs-tireurs. Some 6,000 people were killed and 15,000-20,000 buildings, including whole villages, were destroyed. German forces made a much more systematic use of house demolition tactics during World War II, razing numerous villages in occupied countries in reprisal for the killing of German troops by partisans. On occasions, the Germans massacred the inhabitants, as happened at Oradour-sur-Glane in France and Lidice in Czechoslovakia. The German reprisal policy was deliberately exploited by Soviet partisans, who would place killed Germans near neutral villages in order to trigger a reaction. The Soviets hoped that the resultant retaliatory killings and house demolitions would goad the villagers into actively supporting the partisans.

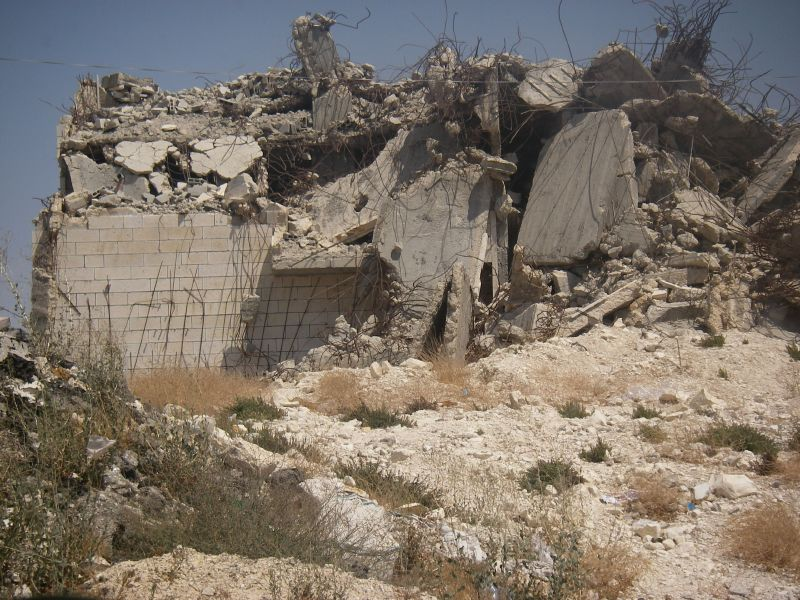
A Palestinian home after demolition by Israeli security forces

The use of punitive house demolitions has been highly controversial in the various conflicts of historical Palestine (now Israel, the West Bank and Gaza Strip). The tactic had originally been used by the Royal Irish Constabulary during the Irish War for Independence, and used again by British forces in Mandatory Palestine during the 1936–1939 Arab revolt in Palestine. It was used as a means to "convince fathers to convince their sons that carrying out a terrorist attack, no matter how justified in the grander struggle, meant enormous hardship for the family." Its use was continued by the Israeli government on-again-off-again fashion during the Second Intifada of the early 21st century, during which more than 3,000 civilian homes have been demolished. Notably, the family homes of a number of Palestinian bombers were targeted in retaliation for terrorist attacks against Israeli targets. However, the usefulness of such tactics has been questioned; in 2005 an Israeli Army commission to study house demolitions found no proof of effective deterrence and concluded that the damage caused by the demolitions outweighed their effectiveness. As a result, the Israel Defense Forces approved the commission's recommendations to end punitive demolitions of Palestinian houses. (See Israeli demolition of Palestinian property for more on this topic.)

=== Civil uses ===
House demolition has been practiced in many states throughout history as a form of punishment for a variety of legal offences. This should be distinguished from purely administrative demolitions, such as in the context of removing illegally constructed homes and other buildings.

During the medieval period, the inhabitants of Flanders and northern France, particularly Picardy, faced the destruction of their homes for a variety of offences. For instance, the demolition of one's house was prescribed for those convicted of harbouring an outlaw. The practice also spread to the Cinque Ports of England, where a burgess who refused to perform his civic duties could find himself liable to have his house destroyed. Elsewhere in Europe, violence against the person was often punished by retaliation against the offender's property. Those convicted of murder in 18th century Montenegro were subject to a rapidly escalating range of penalties; the first offence was merely punished with a fine, but a third offence was punished by the culprit being shot, his home demolished and all of his cattle and property confiscated.

Home demolition was often employed by the state as a means of punishing crimes regarded as exceptionally dishonourable. In a number of medieval European countries, the relatives of those convicted of offences such as incest, sodomy, parricide or treason were sometimes collectively punished by having their homes demolished and their possessions confiscated. Patricide was similarly treated as an offence of exceptional seriousness in Qing Dynasty China; the offender would be executed, his house razed and the earth beneath it dug up. In 18th century Korea, anyone convicted of committing treason or other major offences against the king was punished with the utmost severity; he would be executed along with his entire family, their home would be destroyed and all the contents and possessions confiscated, and nobody else would be permitted to build on the site of the razed house.

The use of house demolition was also prescribed in a number of states for offences against the social order. In the Pre-Columbian Aztec Empire, drunkenness was punished by publicly cutting off the offender's hair and demolishing his house. The illegal sale of alcohol was punished in a similar way in early 20th century Yemen, where a person convicted of selling alcohol to a Muslim would be liable to be bound and tortured and have his home destroyed. Religious offences were punished similarly by the Inquisition; the Treaty of Meaux of 1229, directed against the Albigensians of southern France, provided that "when it is proved before the bishops that any one has died a heretic, his goods shall be destroyed and his house razed."

The Ordinamenti della Guistizia (Ordinances of Justice) of the medieval Italian city-state of Florence mandated a range of harsh penalties against nobles who killed or ordered the killing of citizens; the punishments included execution, the forfeiting of property and the razing of the offender's house. The ordinances were passed against the background of political and social conflict between powerful aristocrats and the ordinary citizens or popolares, and may have been a conscious imitation of the punishments meted out to overmighty aristocrats in the Roman Republic 1,300 years previously, when those suspected of aiming at tyranny risked not only execution but the destruction of their homes as well. This act was seen as a symbolic destruction of the offender's family and social status. To the Romans, the home was more than just a possession; it was a sacred space protected by the Di Penates (household gods) and was a focus for personal honour. Cicero suffered the loss and destruction of his homes at the hands of Publius Clodius Pulcher in 58 BC, and later spoke in his speech De Domo Sua ("About His House") of the "dishonour" and "grief" that he experienced as a result.

== Means ==
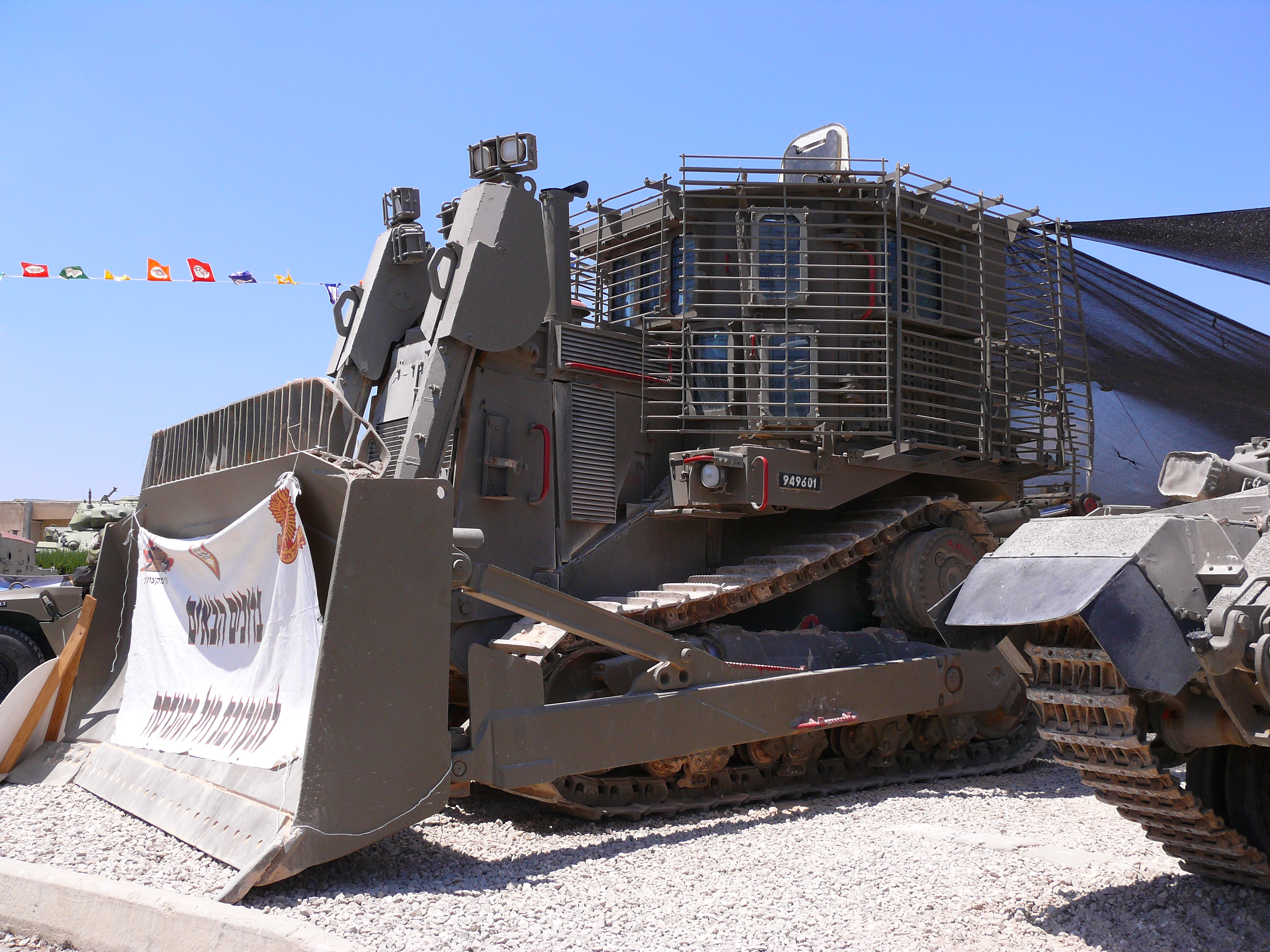
IDF Caterpillar D9R armored bulldozer in service with the Israel Defense Forces Combat Engineering Corps

The demolition of a house for military purposes is often undertaken in very different ways to conventional civilian demolitions. In peacetime situations, demolition is merely the first stage in a process that is usually intended to clear the ground for subsequent re-use (for instance, replacing an old building with a newer one or decommissioning an old industrial building). It is undertaken with extensive preparations, such as stripping the property of items of value, removing hazardous materials such as glass and asbestos insulation, and preparing the structure by removing features that might impede the demolition (such as internal partitions).

Military house demolitions are undertaken with the demolition itself being the primary objective, the aim being to deliberately deny subsequent use of the property. The methods used are therefore focused on simplicity and speed. Unlike civilian demolition, military house demolition is also often intended to destroy property within a building, such as food or personal effects, either to deny its use to an enemy or to impoverish the civilian occupants. House demolitions thus often takes place without the occupant's possessions first being removed and with minimal preparations beforehand.

In many conflicts, demolition frequently is carried out by using fire—often set with the aid of accelerants—as a simple but very effective means of quickly rendering a property uninhabitable. Armored bulldozers or tanks may be used to knock out the walls of a building, causing it to collapse. Combat engineering forces may use explosives to demolish a building, or it may simply be destroyed through direct bombardment by aircraft or artillery. The result is not always the total demolition of a building—the walls may remain standing in the event of a fire, for instance—but it does achieve the main objective of making the building unfit for habitation.

== Legal issues ==
The Lieber Code, promulgated in 1863 by President Abraham Lincoln, was one of the first declarations specifically prohibiting the wanton destruction of a district in wartime.

Article 23(g) of the 1907 Hague Convention on Land Warfare similarly prohibited military forces "to destroy or seize the enemy's property, unless such destruction or seizure be imperatively demanded by the necessities of war", and Article 28 of the same convention stated that "the pillage of a town or place, even when taken by assault, is prohibited."

The massive destruction of civilian property inflicted during Second World War II prompted international jurists to address the issue again in 1945 when the Nuremberg Charter was enacted, establishing the procedures and laws by which the Nuremberg trials were to be conducted. Article 6(b) of the Charter thus condemned the "wanton destruction of cities, towns or villages, or devastation not justified by military necessity" and classified it as a violation of the laws or customs of war. The same definition was replicated in the founding charters of the International Criminal Tribunal for the Former Yugoslavia and the International Criminal Court.

The use of house demolition under international law is today governed by the Fourth Geneva Convention, enacted in 1949, which protects non-combatants in occupied territories. Article 53 provides that "Any destruction by the Occupying Power of real or personal property belonging individually or collectively to private persons ... is prohibited." In its accompanying commentaries, the International Committee of the Red Cross refers to demolition only being justified by "imperative military requirements", which the Convention itself distinguishes from security considerations. The ICRC has clarified that the term "military operations" refers only to "movements, maneuvers, and other action taken by the armed forces with a view to fighting" and does not cover action undertaken as a punishment. In a further reservation, the ICRC regards the tactic as legitimate only "where such destruction is rendered absolutely necessary by military operations". The use of collective punishments is forbidden by the Hague Conventions, as well as by Article 50 of the Fourth Geneva Convention, which expressly prohibits the imposition of punishments on a protected person for an offenses not personally committed.

Israeli use of house demolitions has been particularly controversial. However, Israel, which is a party to the Fourth Geneva Convention, asserts that the terms of the convention are not applicable to the Palestinian territories on the grounds that it does not exercise sovereignty in the territories and is thus under no obligation to apply the treaty in those areas. This position is rejected by human rights organisations such as Amnesty International, which notes that "it is a basic principle of human rights law that international human rights treaties are applicable in all areas in which states parties exercise effective control, regardless of whether or not they exercise sovereignty in that area."

A number of war crimes prosecutions have included charges relating to the illegal destruction of property. A number of those prosecuted by the International Criminal Tribunal for the Former Yugoslavia have been prosecuted for ordering "wanton destruction", and the International Criminal Court has also indicted at least one individual for similar offences in Darfur.

International law nonetheless still permits a fairly wide degree of latitude for military commanders to destroy civilian property when required to do so by military necessity. In U.S. v. Von Leeb, one of the Nuremberg trials held in 1948, Wilhelm Ritter von Leeb and six other senior German generals were accused of the wanton devastation of Soviet villages during a German retreat on the Eastern Front. The acts of destruction were carried out in anticipation of the enemy advancing through the devastated zones in the imminent future and were conducted in mid-winter, when the lack of shelter could reasonably be expected to impede the Russians' progress. The civilian population had been evacuated beforehand. The tribunal found von Leeb and his co-defendants not guilty on the charge of devastation, taking the view that "a great deal of latitude must be accorded" to a commander in a tactical situation such as the one that von Leeb found himself in.

== See also ==
- Domicide
- Laws of war
- International humanitarian law
- British government World War II dehousing paper.
- Israeli demolition of Palestinian property
- Operation Murambatsvina – Robert Mugabe's politically motivated slum clearance in Zimbabwe
