= Topocide =

Human destruction of the landscape

Topocide is the deliberate alteration or destruction of a locale through industrial expansion and change, so that its original landscape and character are destroyed. Topocide can be the result of deliberate industrial expansion, as when industries form, then the people's center of life revolves around that industry. New jobs are formed and the environmental and cultural landscape is forever changed.

A related term is domicide (from Latin domus, meaning home or abode, and caedo, meaning deliberate killing) the destruction of home; the two may be viewed as synonyms or they may be opposed, with topocide referring to destruction from the point of view of the perpetrator(s) and domicide from the perspective of those affected.

== See also ==
- Domicide
