= Domicide =

Deliberate destruction of community resources and homes

Notable examples of domicide

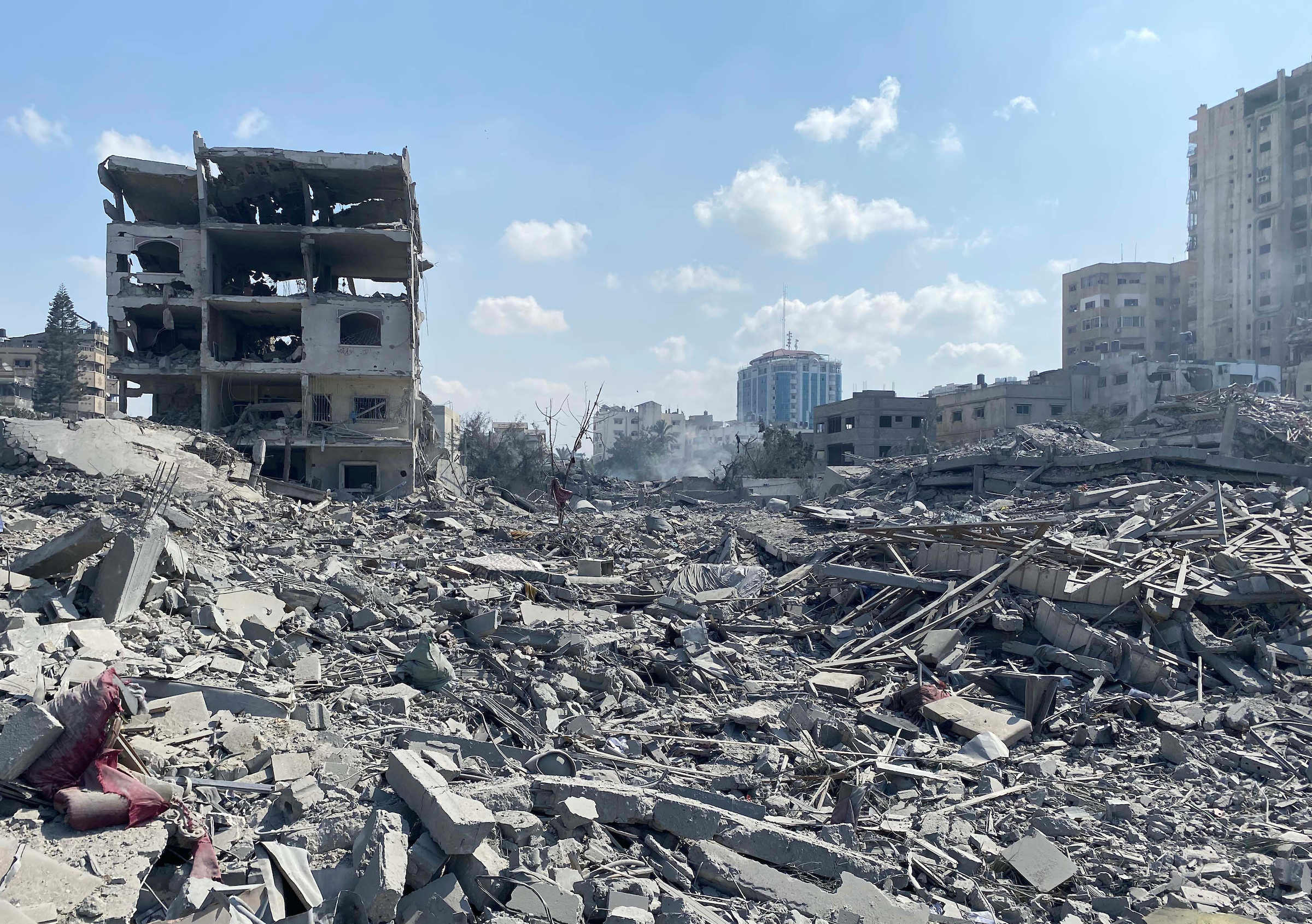
Bombing of the Gaza Strip

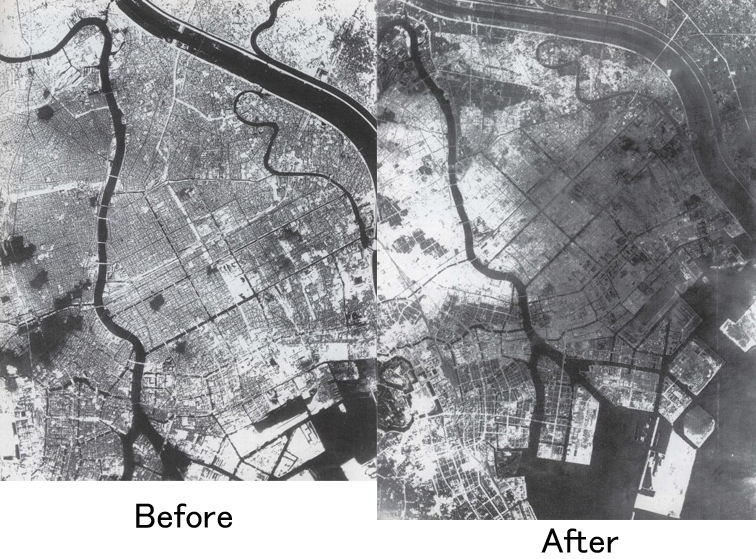
Bombing of Tokyo

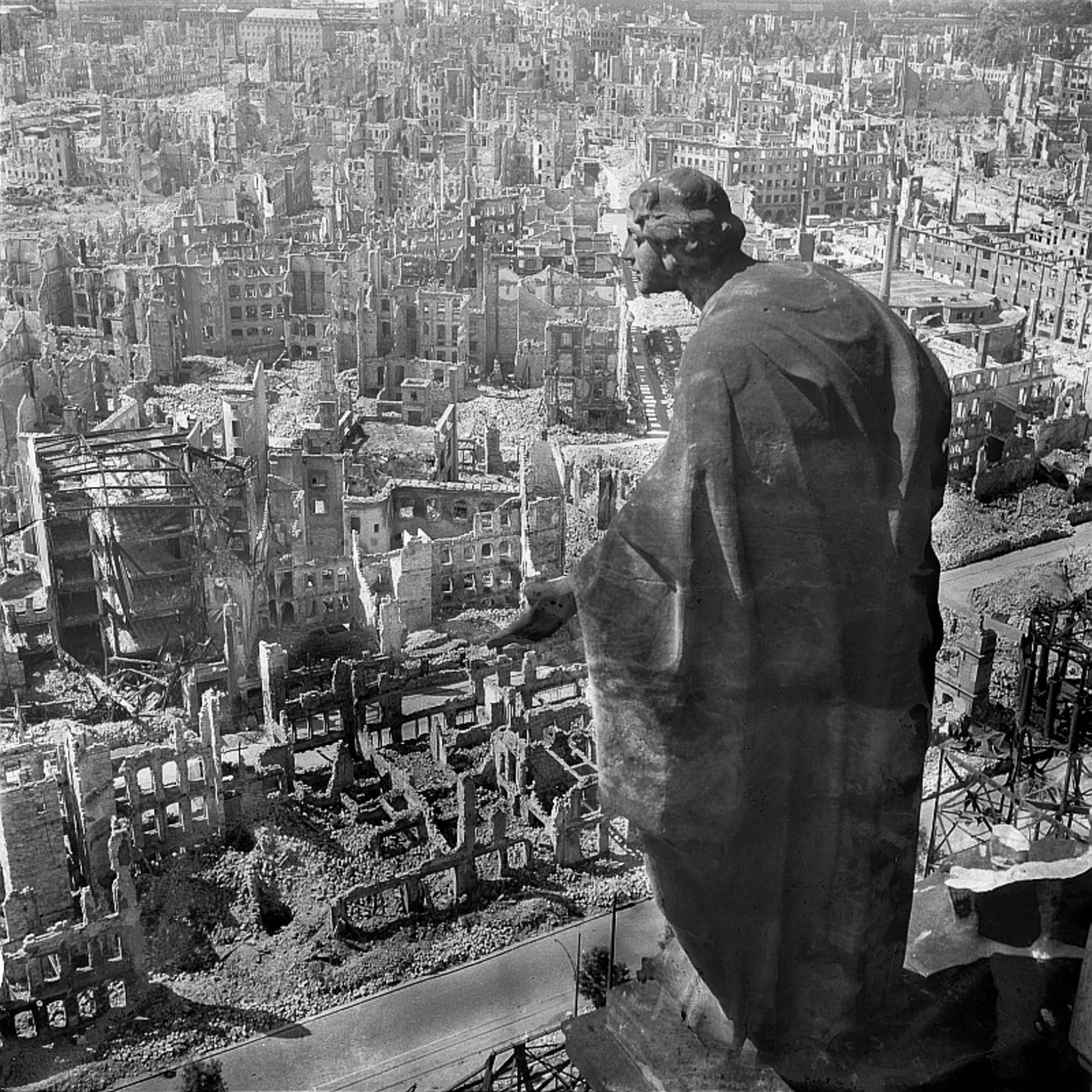
Bombing of Dresden

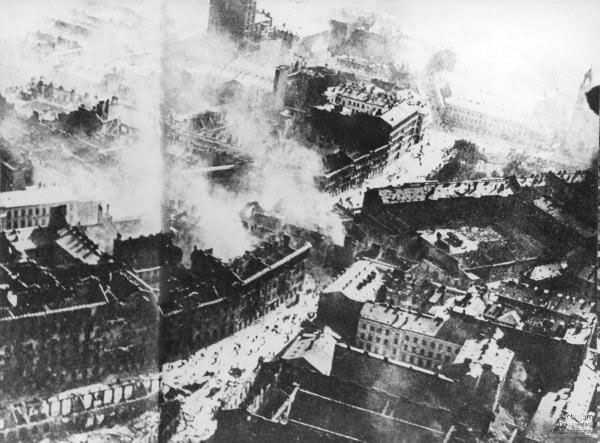
Bombing of Warsaw

Domicide (from Latin domus, meaning home or abode, and -cide, meaning deliberate killing) is "the deliberate destruction of home by human agency in pursuit of specific goals, which causes suffering to the victims." It includes the widespread destruction of a home environment, forcing the homedwellers to move elsewhere.

Scholars have described domicide as a multidimensional assault on human dignity that undermines security, identity, memory, community, and the possibility of return. In recent scholarship, it has been conceptualized as a severe violation of the human right to home and as a mechanism frequently associated with forced displacement, ethnic cleansing, settler colonialism, and atrocity crimes like genocide, crimes against humanity, and war crimes.

== Background ==
The concept of domicide originated in 2001 with J. Douglas Porteous and Sandra E. Smith's Domicide: The Global Destruction of Home. Porteous and Smith argue domicide is not a new phenomenon and can be perpetrated in two ways. First, everyday domicide refers to the destruction of homes that "occurs continuously all over the world and can affect everyone except the wealthy and those who are its perpetrators… [It] comes about because of the normal, mundane operation of the world's political economy." This can include, but is not limited to: urban redevelopment, economic restructuring, gentrification, and public infrastructure construction. Extreme domicide, by contrast, "involved major, planned operations that occur rather sporadically in time but often affect large areas and change the lives of considerable numbers of people." This can include: scorched earth campaigns, strategic bombing, forced resettlement, securitization, ethnic cleansing, colonial expansion, and more. Martin Coward argues the built environment is a material basis for political life, and its destruction is inherently an assault on both human communities and the conditions that make plural coexistence possible.

In February 2022, Bree Akesson and Andrew R. Basso proposed the criminalization of domicide through a Convention Against Domicide in international law in their book, From Bureaucracy to Bullets: Extreme Domicide and the Right to Home. The authors argue the deliberate destruction of home is a multidimensional assault on human dignity and should be recognized as an extreme violation of the right to home and a central mechanism of atrocity. The authors provide a systematic normative and human rights-based theory that grounds domicide in what they call the human right to home. Akesson and Basso also argue domicidal violence can be indirect (e.g., lawfare, legislating against and repressing groups, and political coercion) or direct (e.g., using physical state or non-state violence to destroy homes). They construct a theoretical model to predict domicide in their work.

Further operationalizing domicide as a justiciable crime, the UN Special Rapporteur on the Right to Adequate Housing, Balakrishnan Rajagopal, echoed and augmented these calls for domicide's criminalization in a July 2022 report to the United Nations General Assembly. Rajagopal's report argued for the integration of domicide as a crime against humanity in the Rome Statute. He has since published widely calling for the criminalization of domicide and noting processes of domicide globally, including a 2026 report which highlighted domicide in Gaza, Myanmar, Sudan, and Ukraine. The issue of domicide is now central to the mission of the Special Rapporteur.

== Defining home ==
Jan Willem Duyvendak argues:

a house only becomes a home as meanings and feelings—in other words, a certain symbolic value—are attributed to it. This implies that the material world in itself has no real 'home value'; for this it needs meanings and feelings to be attached.

He further noted home is a place of familiarity, haven, and heaven, noting the socially constructed meanings attached to material house structures. Akesson and Basso write, "the materials that make a home—straw, cement, bricks—come together to create the structure of the house. But once the house's inhabitants start to experience it as a place of feeling and memory, which may happen immediately, then it becomes a home." Moreover, the destruction of home is not limited to the house structure itself as home extends beyond structures and includes attachment, identity, community, and ontological security. Homes can be considered castles (as a place for family life, center of identity, and place of security) as well as cages (as an unhealthy space, a lack of privacy, and a prison). Ammar Azzouz argues home is more than a shelter; it is a space of memory and identity.

== Domicidal violence ==
The protections for home in international human rights laws and norms are underdeveloped but exist within an "overlapping consensus against extreme domicide." The right to home is grounded in the human right to an "adequate standard of living." This has been interpreted to cover necessities like water, food, health, among others. The right to home also overlaps with broad protections for property rights, freedom of residence, and rights against unlawful interference. The right to home intersects with the rights of persons with disabilities, women's rights, child rights, Indigenous rights, and non-discrimination rights, as well.

In the laws of armed conflict, there are general prohibitions on the wanton destruction or aerial bombardment of cities and towns, destruction of private property not of a military necessity, and against reprisals. Domicide is often a cooperative mechanism with processes of atrocity crime perpetration, including forced displacement, as well. Scholars argue domicide is used to punish dissenting communities, reshape demographic and political landscapes, divide peoples, exert state control, expropriate property, erase communities and their territorial presence, and prevent return. Extreme domicide often incorporates intertwined material, legal, political, social, and symbolic violence.

Domicide typically results in three different outcomes for home structures. First, homes could be razed to the ground. Second, home structures may be left standing and assimilated by another group. Third, homes may be left intentionally vacant to create communal dividing lines or barriers.

Domicide can be an event that occurs quickly, or a process that plays out over time and space. Successive campaigns perpetrated against the same targeted group over time where domicidal violence compounds on itself can also be called "cumulative domicide."

Scholars also note that reconstruction processes can reproduce domicidal outcomes when rebuilding excludes displaced residents, formalizes expropriation, or prevents return, a process sometimes described as "domicidal reconstruction."

Recognizing domicide as a distinct form of violence has been proposed as a means of improving atrocity prevention, early warning, victim-centered reparations, and international legal accountability.

== Examples ==
Notable historical examples of domicide include: the American bombing of Tokyo, which was the most destructive and deadly non-nuclear bombing in human history, the bombing of Warsaw, Dresden, and Königsberg during World War II, and the destruction perpetrated by the Khmer Rouge in Cambodia.

The Israeli bombing of the Gaza Strip is considered to be one of the most destructive campaigns in recent history. Balakrishnan Rajagopal, United Nations Special Rapporteur on adequate housing, accused Israel of committing domicide in the Gaza Strip during the Gaza war.

Porteus and Smith also highlight the Indian Removal Act as a definite case of domicide.

The demolition of Muslim homes, mosques and businesses in India has been studied as a form of domicide. Researcher Fahad Zuberi described the practice of "bulldozer justice" as punitive domicide in a 2026 study of the 2022 demolitions in Jahangiri.

== See also ==
- Arson
- Dahiya doctrine
- Dehousing
- Dignity taking
- Ethnic cleansing
- Ethnic hatred
- Exclusionary zoning
- Genocide
- House demolition (military)
- Persecution
- Political cleansing of population
- Population cleansing
- Social cleansing
- State crime
- Topocide
- Urbicide
