= Urbicide =

Violent destruction of an urban area

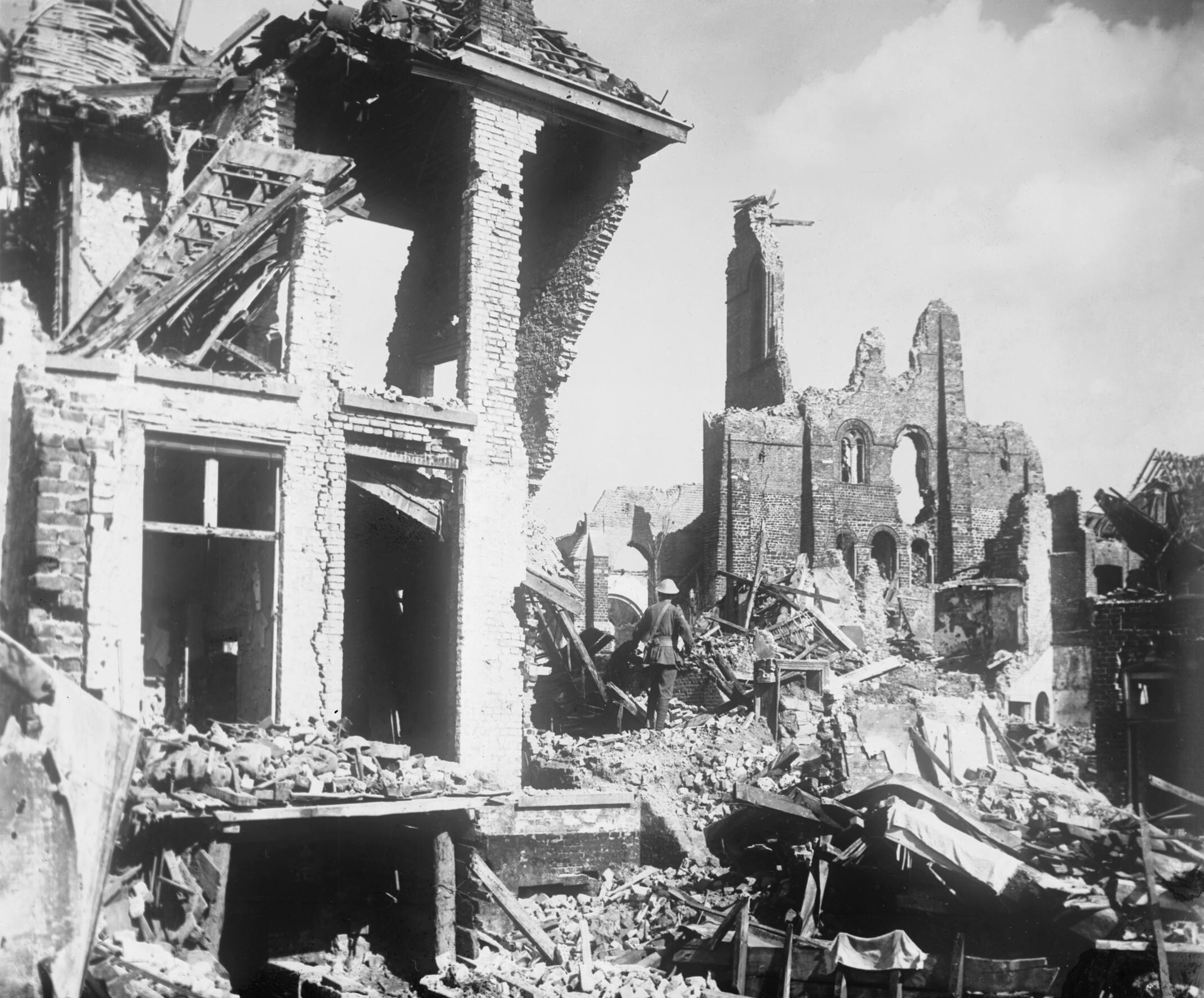
The city of Ypres during World War I

Urbicide is a term which describes the deliberate wrecking or "killing" of a city, by direct or indirect means. It literally translates as "city-killing" (Latin urbs 'city' + Latin occido 'to kill'). The term was initially used by urban planners and architects to describe 20th-century practices of urban redevelopment in the United States. Writers like Ada Louise Huxtable and Marshall Berman highlighted the impacts of aggressive redevelopment on the urban social experience.

Especially after the siege of Sarajevo, the term has increasingly been used to describe violence specifically directed to the destruction of an urban area. At the conclusion of the Yugoslav Wars, urbicide began to emerge as a distinct legal concept in international law. The exact constraints and definition of this term continues to be debated, and because the study of urbicide intersects with a number of disciplines including international politics, anthropology, and sociology, it has been difficult for scholars and policymakers to set a definition which satisfies all these fields.

The term has come into being in an age of rapid globalization and urbanization, and although the scholarly focus on systematic violence and destruction in the context of the city is relatively new, the practice of urbicide is thousands of years old.

== In premodern times ==
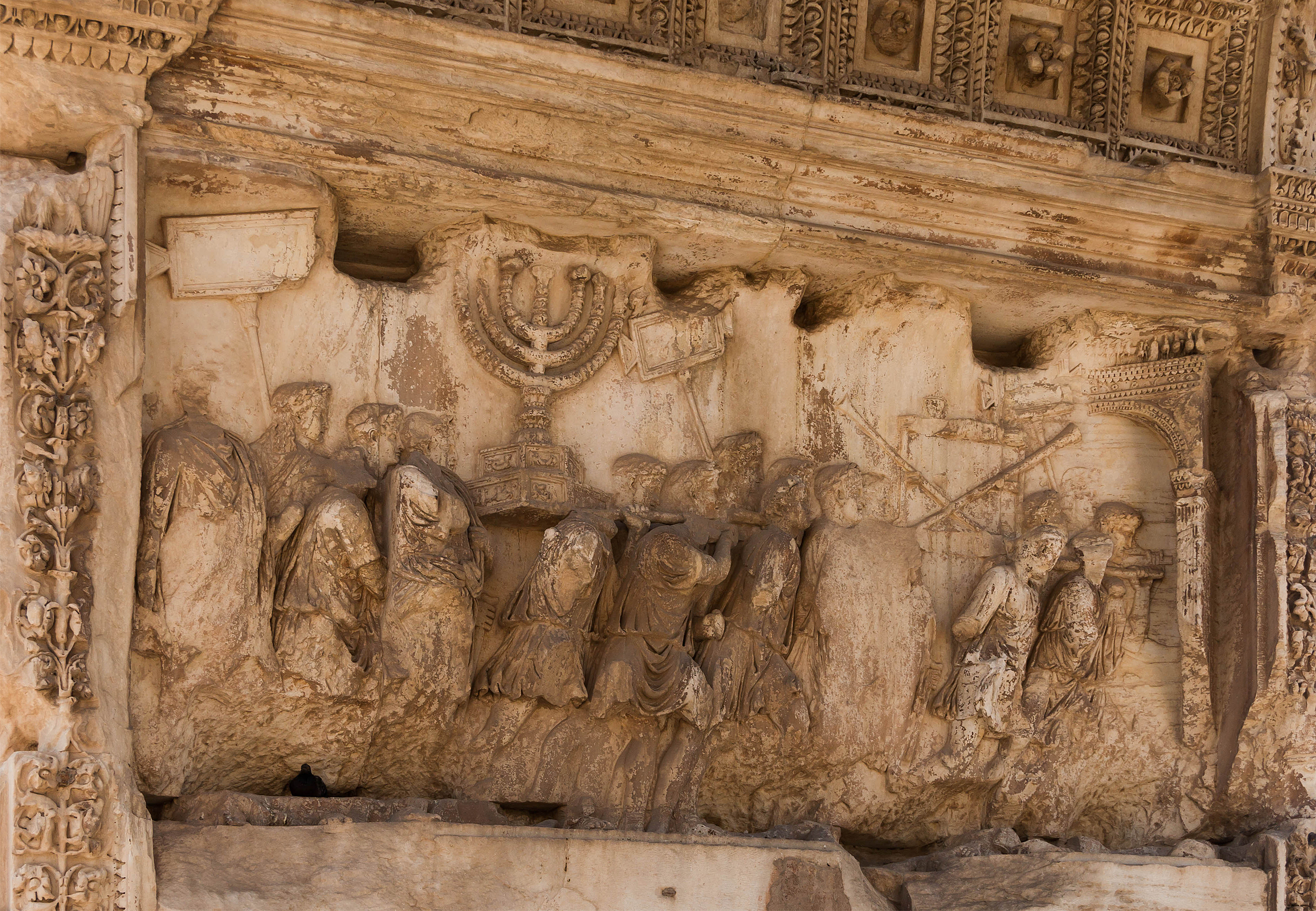
Jerusalem was razed by the Romans during the Jewish Revolt in 70 CE. This relief from the Arch of Titus shows the spoils from the destroyed Temple paraded in Rome

Marshall Berman, an American Marxist writer and political theorist, acknowledges the relatively recent inception of the term urbicide, and the subsequent study of urban destruction as a distinct phenomenon. However, Berman asserts that urbicide has existed as long as cities have, calling it "the oldest story in the world." Berman cites Euripides' tragedy The Trojan Women and the Old Testament books of Jeremiah and Lamentations as some of the earliest recorded musings on the nature and meaning of urbicide. He cites themes such as the breakdown of everyday life, the inability to care for oneself, and the suffering of one's children and inability to care for or comfort them as persistent themes in urbicides of all eras. Berman also sees the breakdown of traditional norms and leadership hierarchies and a loss of meaning in life as commonalities throughout both ancient and modern literature.

For Euripides, even if there is no meaning in the universe, one's city itself turns out to be a source of meaning. Even if it is burning down—maybe especially when it is burning down—the bonds between us and our city can give our lives some solid value. Thus the Trojan women console themselves that their loved ones died for something real, in defense of their city—unlike the Greek heroes, who lived and died for conquest, for booty, for plunder, for nothing at all.

— Marshall Berman, "Falling Towers: Life After Urbicide", Geography and Identity (1993)

Classicists Sylvian Fachard and Edward M. Harris suggest that while damage as a result of conquest was common in the ancient Greek world, instances of urbicide were rare and that "With the means available for antiquity, it would be surprising to record destruction rates superior to 20–30 percent".

In later times the Roman Empire imposed the complete destruction of Jerusalem (70 CE) and a similarly devastating Carthaginian peace (146 BCE), though these proved less than permanent. Carthage was sacked and rebuilt many times, but did not remain in ruin until Muslim armies established the port of Tunis a few miles away, diverting trade and population away from the ancient city. In the case of Jerusalem, a small Roman colony was established on its ruins a few decades after the Jewish war, but the city only surpassed its pre-war size eighteen centuries later, in the 19th century.

In 1156, William I of Sicily captured Bari in southern Italy. After its capture, William ordered the destruction of the city and gave its inhabitants two days to leave. Archaeologist Giulia Bellato argues that while the destruction of the city may not have been comprehensive "when combined with forced exile, the targeted destruction of a few significant buildings would have been sufficient to dismantle the local political and social networks that were deeply ingrained in the city’s residential fabric".

Other authors have cited the destruction of Tenochtitlán (1521) and Moscow (1812) as examples of premodern urbicide. The Mongols under Genghis Khan's leadership destroyed many cities, including Merv in Central Asia.

== Modern examples ==
Bombing of Tokyo

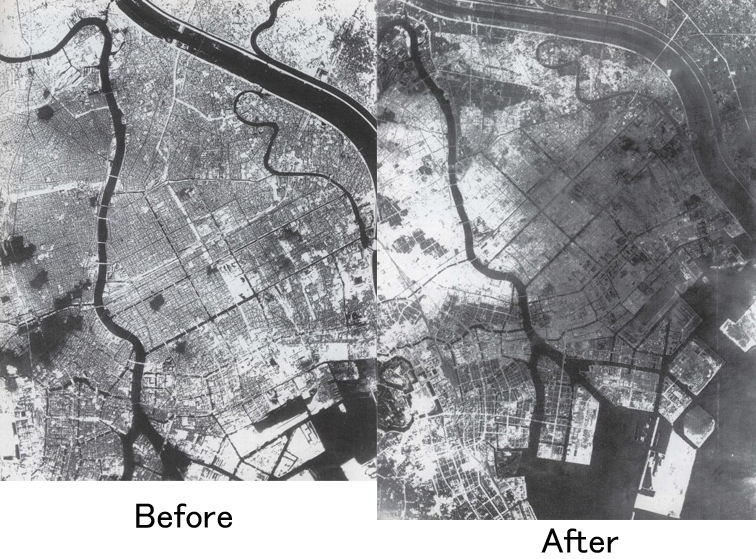
Downtown Tokyo before and after the March 1945 air raids

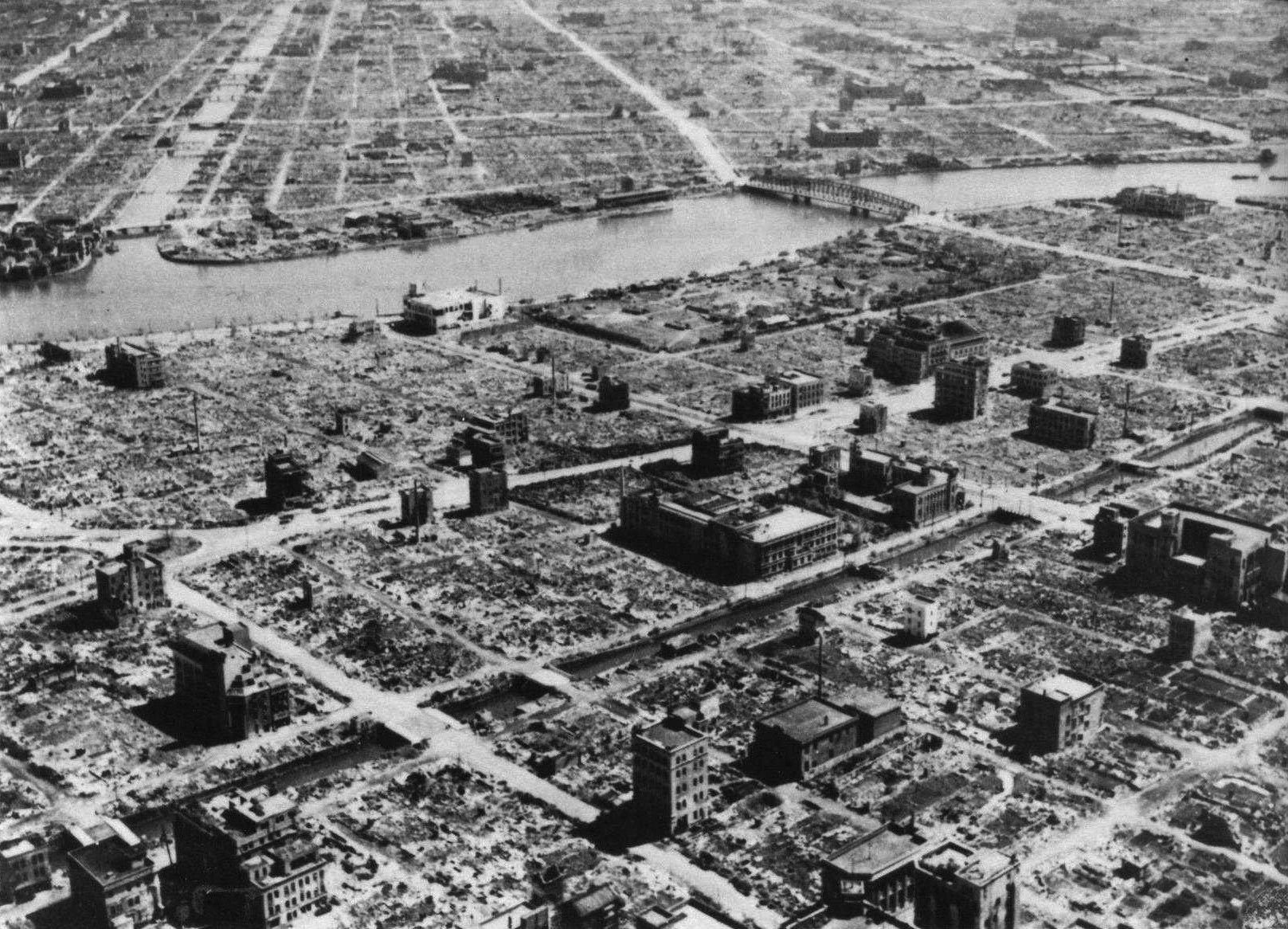
A birds-eye view over the Ningyōchō district after the air raid of 10 March 1945

American cities were victims of the 1970s global recession, aggravated by the decline of government and private investment, which resulted in urban decay described as the "age of rubble". This situation led to ghettoization and exodus in large areas like the South Bronx. Frank D'Hont mentions a number of cases in late 20th century Europe, and criticises how Europeans urban planners neglected the preservation of the urban fabric "in times of war and conflict" under the assumption that conflict was not a problem in modern Europe. D'Hont included the Balkans (focusing on Kosovo), Derry, Belfast, Nicosia, and even ghettoized areas of Paris.

=== Second World War ===
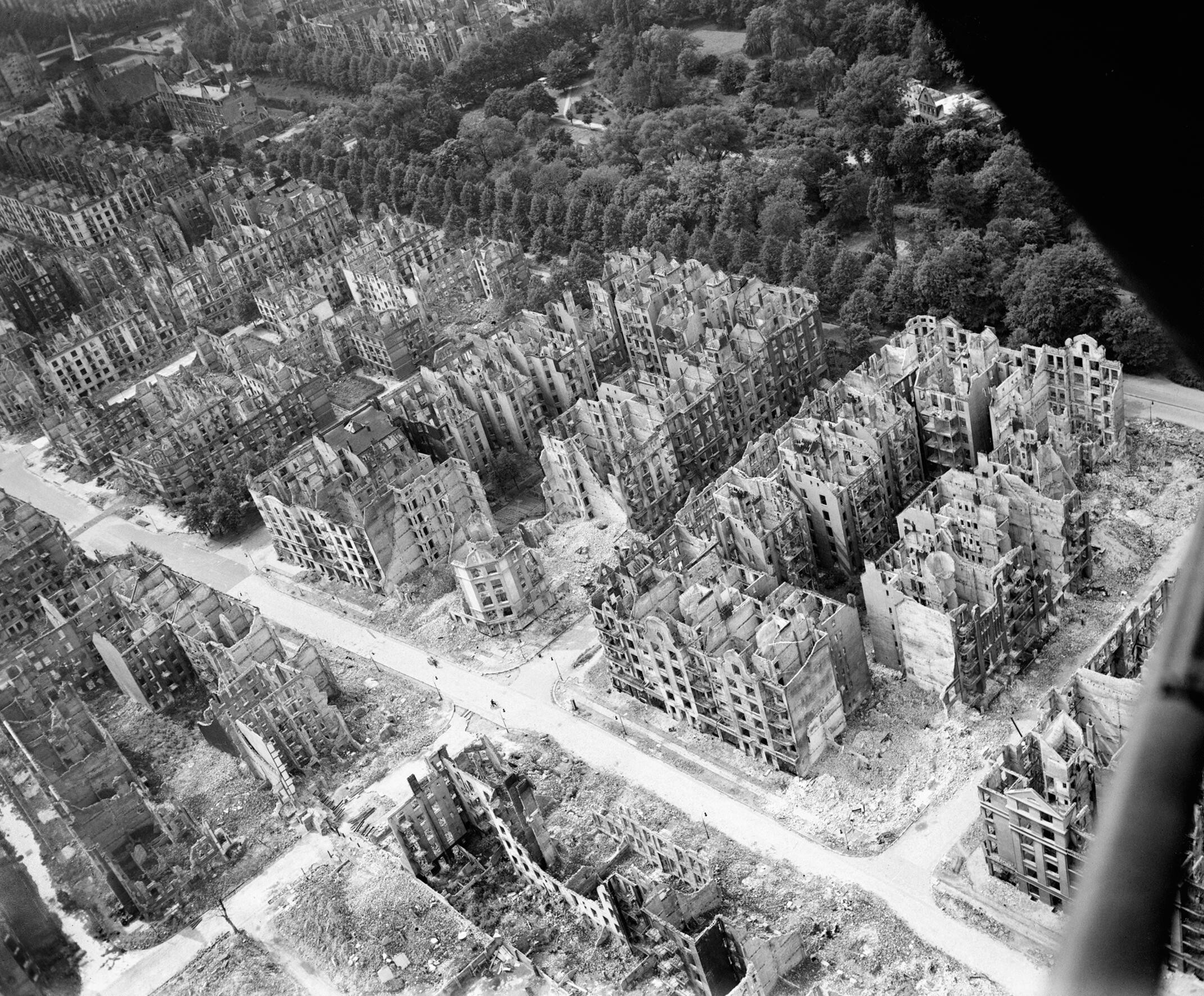
Hamburg after the 1943 bombing. The city was completely destroyed during the Anglo-American bombing in World War II.

The Second World War saw some of the earliest and most extreme examples of the aerial destruction of cities such as Dresden, Tokyo, Hiroshima and Nagasaki. The development of aerial bombardment and nuclear weapons made cities and their infrastructure into targets of war in a new and devastating way.

==== Tokyo ====
On the night of March 9–10, 1945, during a raid by the US Armed Forces, Tokyo was subjected to the most destructive and deadly non-nuclear bombing in human history. 41 km² of central Tokyo was destroyed and a quarter of the city burned to the ground, leaving approximately 100,000 civilians dead and more than a million homeless. By comparison, the atomic bombing of Hiroshima on August 6, 1945, resulted in the deaths of approximately 70,000 to 150,000 people.

==== Stalingrad ====
During the German invasion of the Soviet Union, the German Army destroyed several cities in the Soviet Union, causing a deliberate destruction of vital civilian infrastructure, including in Stalingrad. The city was firebombed with 1,000 tons of high explosives and incendiaries in 1,600 sorties on 23 August 1943. The aerial assault on Stalingrad was the most concentrated on the Ostfront according to Beevor, and was the single most intense aerial bombardment on the Eastern Front at that point. At least 90% of the housing stock was obliterated during the first week of the bombing, with an estimated 40,000 killed.

==== Warsaw ====
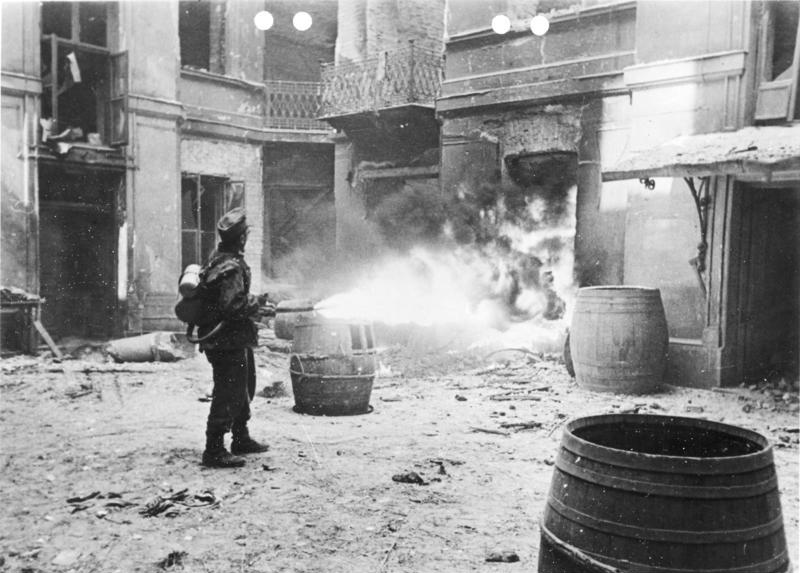
A German soldier sets fire to a building in Warsaw

The city [Warsaw] must completely disappear from the surface of the earth and serve only as a transport station for the Wehrmacht. No stone can remain standing. Every building must be razed to its foundation.

— SS chief Heinrich Himmler, SS officers' conference, 17 October 1944

During the Nazi occupation of Poland, Nazi Germany deliberately razed most of the city of Warsaw after the 1944 Warsaw Uprising. The uprising had infuriated German leaders, who decided to make an example of the city, although Nazi Germany had long selected Warsaw for major reconstruction as part of their Lebensraum policy and Generalplan Ost, the plans to Germanize Central and Eastern Europe and eliminate, ethnically cleanse, or enslave the native Polish and Slavic populations.

The Nazis dedicated an unprecedented effort to destroy the city. Their decision tied up considerable resources which could have been used at the Eastern Front and at the newly-opened Western Front following the Normandy landings. The Germans destroyed 80–90% of Warsaw's buildings and deliberately demolished, burned, or stole an immense part of its cultural heritage, completely destroying Warsaw's Old Town.

==== Hiroshima and Nagasaki ====
The atomic bombings of Hiroshima and Nagasaki demonstrated the extremes of the new levels of destruction made possible by modern military technology. Five square miles of Hiroshima were destroyed in seconds, with 90% of the city's 76,000 buildings destroyed. The urban fabric of Nagasaki faced a similar fate. A notable characteristic of the atomic bombings was the totality of the destruction; the way that "the whole of society was laid waste to its very foundations."

Destroyed, that is, were not only men, women and thousands of children but also restaurants and inns, laundries, theater groups, sports clubs, sewing clubs, boys' clubs, girls' clubs, love affairs, trees and gardens, grass, gates, gravestones, temples and shrines, family heirlooms, radios, classmates, books, courts of law, clothes, pets, groceries and markets, telephones, personal letters, automobiles, bicycles, horses—120 war-horses—musical instruments, medicines and medical equipment, life savings, eyeglasses, city records, sidewalks, family scrapbooks, monuments, engagements, marriages, employees, clocks and watches, public transportation, street signs, parents, works of art.

— Richard Rhodes, "The Making of the Atomic Bomb"

Also notable is the fact that the total destruction faced by the bombed cities was brief, and quickly reversed. Though total recovery took time, water and power were restored within a week and the population of Hiroshima surged from 89,000 to 169,000 in the six months following the bombing.

=== Beirut ===
Beirut, once known as the "Paris of the Middle East", has been seen as the paradigmatic case of urbicide in the late 20th century. The city was divided and widely destroyed during the Lebanese Civil War between 1975 and 1990. Many symbols of the golden age were ruined or demolished in the course of the conflict and in the subsequent decades by the repeated military interventions of Israel, economic crisis, social turmoil and most recently the devastating explosion of 2020. Attempts of reconstruction also saw old French-style architecture erased in order to build new projects. According to urbanist Joanne Choueiri, the different factions of the civil strife modeled the city since 1975 in order to create "liminality", this is, a vacuum that the author calls "political holes" in the urban fabric to split the areas controlled by the warring parties. These empty spaces represent the destruction of a shared environment, and a "history of urbicide".

=== Northern Ireland ===
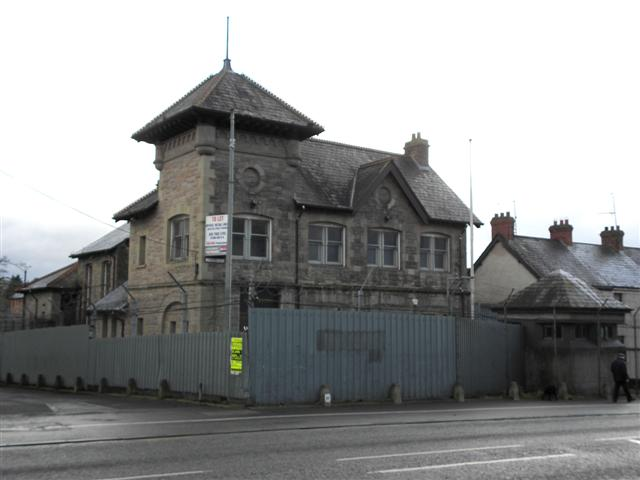
An example of fortified urban landscape in Northern Ireland: former Cookstown Courthouse still showing a sentry box, anti-blast walls and barbed wire in 2009

Belfast city center's role during the Troubles fluctuated as the conflict evolved. From 1970 to 1974, the IRA targeted high-profile businesses, destroying 300 retail outlets and over a quarter of the city's retail space. The wave of destruction of the urban space spread to other areas of Northern Ireland, like Derry since the 1970s and even to commercial centres of smaller towns toward the end of the conflict in the 1990s. The Europa Hotel on Belfast's Great Victoria Street gained notoriety as the world's most bombed building. In response, security forces erected a 'ring of steel', encircling downtown with steel gates and armed guards to protect businesses and search pedestrians; this led, in the words of urbanist Jon Coaffee, to the "defensive landscape transformation" of Belfast, which extended to most parts of the province. This measures forced bombers to adapt, using smaller, incendiary devices. However, the security measures significantly disrupted shopping and daily life, with bag searches and bus inspections becoming commonplace. Non-parking areas, permanent checkpoints, army foot patrols, armoured vehicles, bollards, barbed wire, shop windows covered with tape and tilted surfaces placed over windowsills turned the city center into a fortified zone. Local press at the time (1972) observed with a certain black humor that the city "looks more and more like the western front as time goes by". The Troubles reshaped Northern Ireland's urban landscape, as cities and towns were fortified with steel barriers, iron shutters, and "bomb-proof" buildings. These measures, along with the constant threat of paramilitary attacks, stripped away the normalcy of urban life. The policy of "normalisation" gradually removed military structures and defensive facilities since 1994, but the legacy of conflict is still visible, however, through urban segregation; Belfast's physical infrastructure was weaponized, with walls used to isolate neighborhoods. The impact of this division preexisted the conflict and continued beyond it. Indeed, ten years after the Good Friday Agreement, Belfast remained a "physically and mentally" fragmented city.

=== Yugoslav Wars ===
==== Vukovar ====
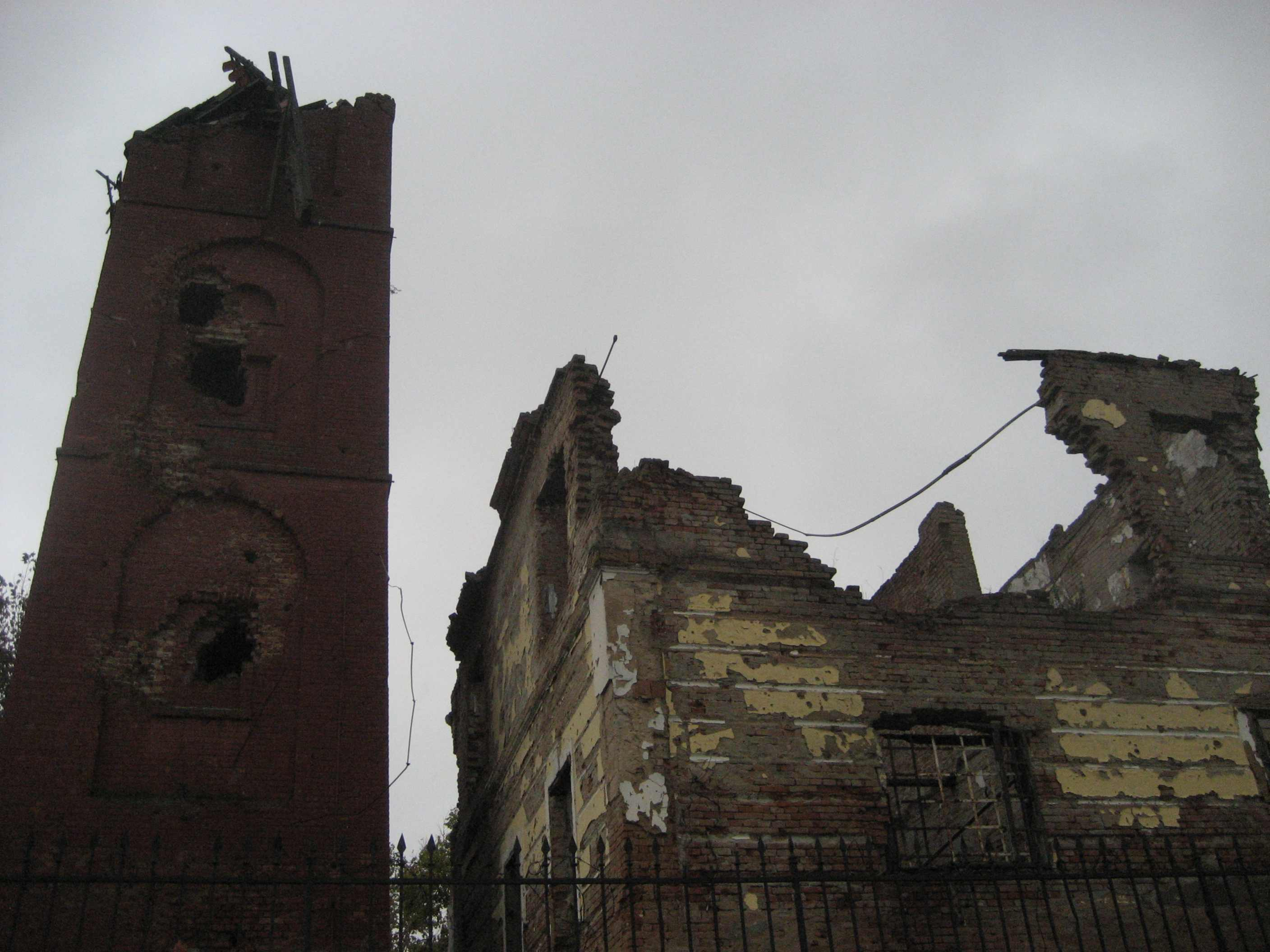
The fall of Vukovar has been accompanied by widespread destruction in the area. Castle Eltz was in ruins

The siege of Vukovar was an 87-day military campaign aimed against the eastern Croatian city of Vukovar led by the Yugoslav People's Army, supported by various Serbian paramilitary forces between August and November 1991 during the Croatian War of Independence. Vukovar suffered an indiscriminate bombardment, in which up to a million shells were fired on the city, Three quarters of the city's buildings were destroyed. Among them were schools, hospitals, churches, public institutions’ facilities, factories, the medieval Eltz Manor and the house of the Nobel laureate scientist Lavoslav Ružička. Several sources, like the Youth Initiative for Human Rights in Serbia, described the systematic destruction of the city as urbicide. Youth Initiative for Human Rights in Serbia also criticized the International Criminal Tribunal for the former Yugoslavia in 2009 for not reaching a verdict for the destruction of Vukovar. Slobodan Milošević was indicted for, inter alia, "wanton destruction" of the city, in one of the first occasions in history that international law dealt with urbicide. Milošević died before a verdict was reached. Goran Hadžić was also indicted in the same category and also died while awaiting trial in 2016.

==== Sarajevo ====
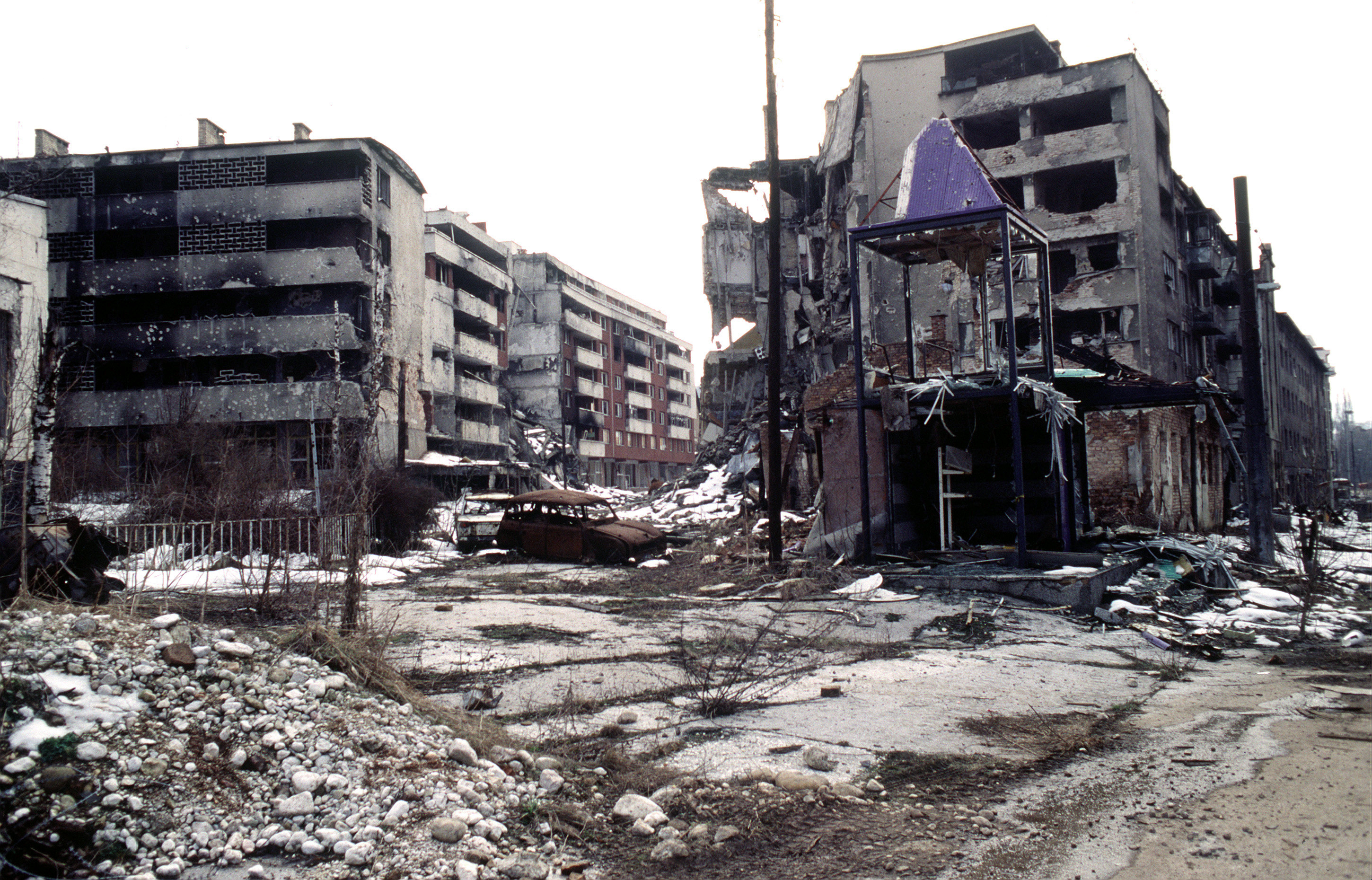
Heavily destroyed apartment buildings in Sarajevo

Violence in Sarajevo was a product of the Bosnian War, which lasted from 1992–1995 in which Serb forces of the Republika Srpska and the Yugoslav People's Army besieged Sarajevo. This region was very ethnically diverse, providing homes for both Serbs and Muslim Slavs. The violence is sometimes referred to as ethnic cleansing which ended in some of the worst violence this region has ever seen. Ultimately, urbicide resulted in the complete annihilation of Sarajevo's built environment. This broke down the city's infrastructure and denied thousands of civilians food, water, medicine, etc. In the wake of this violence, Sarajevo's civilians also became victims of human rights offenses including rape, execution, and starvation. The Bosnian government declared the siege over in 1996.

The International Criminal Tribunal for the former Yugoslavia (ICTY) convicted four Serb officials for numerous counts of crimes against humanity which they committed during the siege, including terrorism. Stanislav Galić and Dragomir Milošević were sentenced to life imprisonment and 29 years imprisonment respectively. Their superiors, Radovan Karadžić and Ratko Mladić, were also convicted and sentenced to life imprisonment.

=== Zimbabwe ===
At least 700,000 Zimbabweans were forced from their urban homes and were left to create new lives for themselves during Operation Murambatsvina in May 2005. Operation Murambatsvina or "Operation Restore Order" was a countrywide program of targeted violence against cities, towns, peripheral urban areas, and resettled farms, resulting in the destruction of housing, trading markets, and other "collective" structures. It was a large-scale operation, resulting in the displacement of over 700,000 refugees. Beyond the obvious violations of human rights, Operation Murambatsvina unhinged the urban and rural poor from the collective structures integral to everyday, grounded existence in favor of dispersal, but without active state measures to reinstitute these people within governable spaces.

=== Syrian Civil War ===
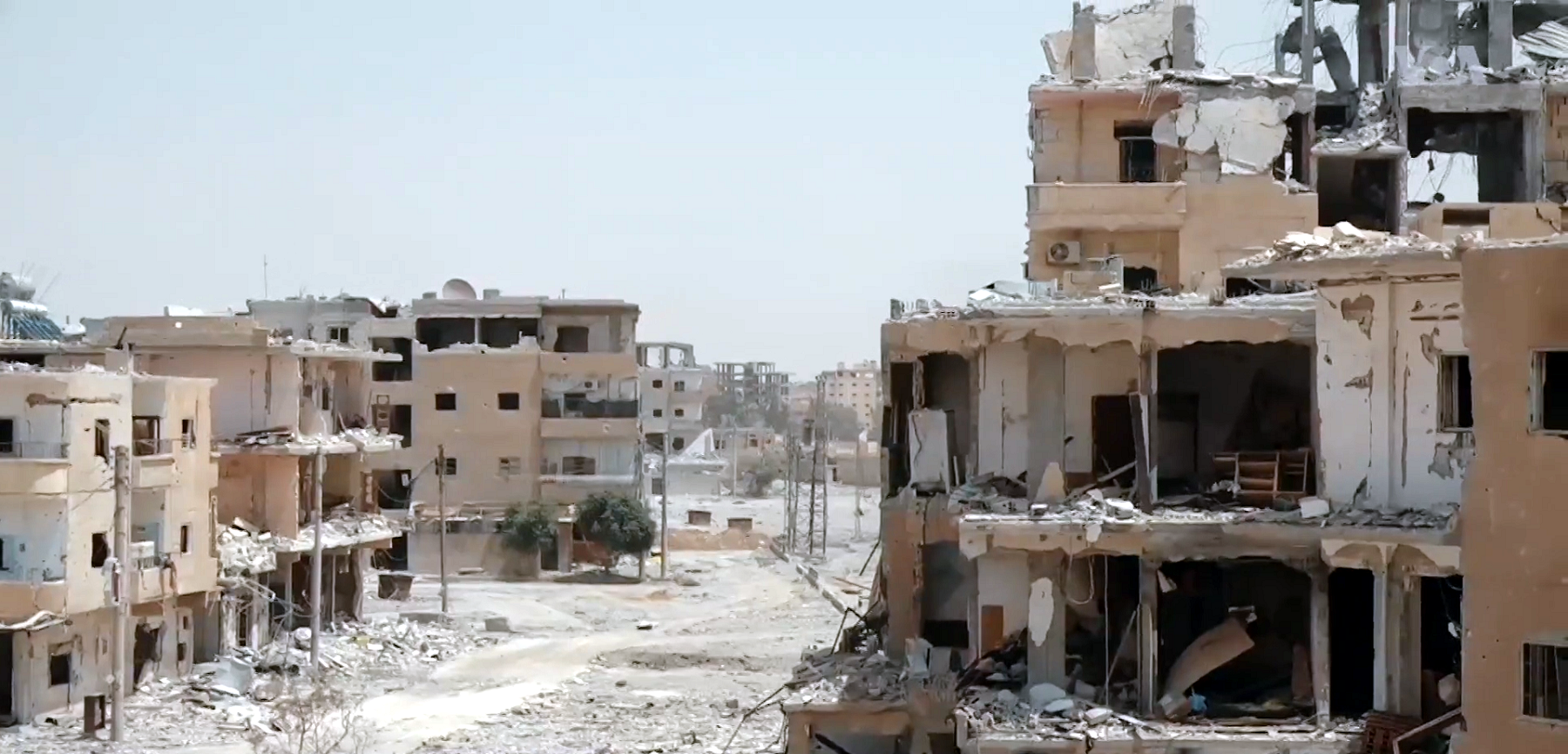
Much of Raqqa suffered extensive damage during the battle

Robert Templer and AlHakam Shaar proposed that the deliberate destruction of Aleppo during the Battle of Aleppo was a form of "urbicide".

In 2017, retired US Army officer and urban-warfare researcher John Spencer listed Mosul as one of the cities destroyed by violent combat, joining battles such as Stalingrad, Huế, Grozny, Aleppo and Raqqa.

Around 80% of Raqqa had been left "uninhabitable" after the battle, according to the UN.

=== Russo-Ukrainian War ===
Since 2014, the Russian military invasion has caused significant destruction of Ukrainian cities, with the goal of "destroying heterogeneous cultural and symbolic urban space and the diversity of the urban cultural heritage". During the 2022 Russian invasion of Ukraine, the Russian Army destroyed even more cities in eastern Ukraine, causing a deliberate destruction of vital civilian infrastructure, including in Severodonetsk, Kramatorsk, Mariupol and Bakhmut. It was described by the New Lines Institute as follows: "from the onset of Russian President Vladimir Putin’s invasion of Ukraine, Russia has engaged in a sustained and systematic campaign of urbicide".

The Russian Army also perpetrated wanton destruction of Ukrainian cities and cultural destruction, including confiscating and burning Ukrainian books, historical archives, and damaging more than 240 Ukrainian heritage sites. 90% of Mariupol was destroyed by the Russian 2022 siege. Marinka and Popasna were similarly completely destroyed and were described as "post-apocalyptic wasteland" and "ghost towns".

From February to June 2022, 27 Ukrainian cities were subjected to Russian shelling, bombing or street fighting every 10 days, 7 cities every fourth day, while four cities were subjected to it every second day. Moreover, cities with higher signs of Ukrainian identity were targeted the heaviest. Since March 2024, a dozen energy facilities were destroyed by Russian attacks, causing shortages of electricity and running water for millions of Ukrainians. In 2024, the UN estimated that Ukraine will need $486 billion for reconstructing the damage done by the Russian destruction, including for two million destroyed homes (accounting for 10% of Ukraine's housing network).

=== Gaza war ===
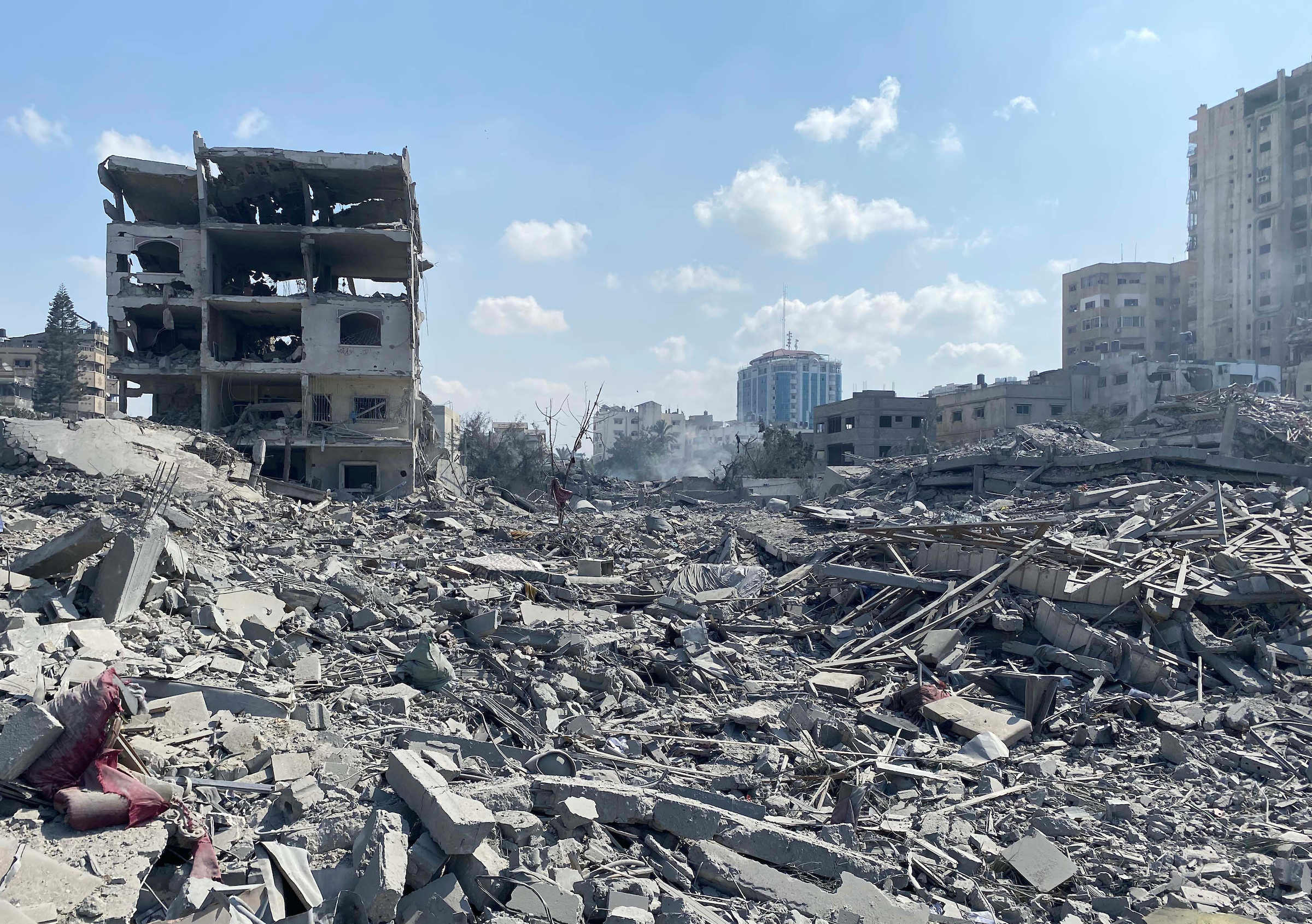
War destruction in Gaza City, 10 October 2023

Israeli destruction of cities in Palestine has been described as an urbicide, particularly Gaza during the Gaza war when more than half of Gaza's buildings were damaged or destroyed by January 2024; this had increased to 70% by December 2024. In April 2025, the United Nations estimated that approximately 92% of all residential buildings in Gaza have been damaged or destroyed since the start of the conflict. The devastation has been described by some as something that "goes beyond material boundaries; it becomes a social and cultural catastrophe". Fatina Abreek Zubiedat, an assistant professor at Tel Aviv University Azrieli School of Architecture said that the wanton destruction of Gaza is reducing the urban area into "an ahistorical entity, something present outside modernity and global experience".

== Terminology ==
The term "urbicide" has its roots in the Latin word urbs, meaning "city", and occido, meaning "to massacre". In 1944, Raphael Lemkin defined genocide as "a coordinated plan of different actions aiming at the destruction of essential foundations of national groups, with the aim of annihilating the groups themselves". This term, however, failed to address violence not aimed at human bodies. The first recorded use of the term "urbicide" was by Michael Moorcock in the Elric novella "Dead God's Homecoming" (Science Fantasy #59, Nova Publishing, June 1963). Marshall Berman (1987) was one of the first academics to apply the term to a real world situation. In the wake of the destruction of Sarajevo, the term gained more common usage from Bogdan Bogdanović and others. In their 1992 publication "Mostar '92", a group of Bosnian architects from Mostar used the term urbicide to define the violence against the city fabric, such as the destruction of the Mostar bridge, a usage consistent with Marshall Berman's prior use of the term to describe similar acts of violence in Bosnia.

Scholars have argued that urbicide is often closely related to genocide, as to destroy people's everyday lives is to destroy them. In his book Urbicide, Martin Coward argues along a similar line. Coward uses the term to denote "the destruction of buildings qua that which constitutes the conditions of possibility of a distinctively ‘urban’ existential quality... the urban is characterised by heterogeneity. Urbicide is thus an assault on buildings as the conditions of possibility of heterogeneity." Coward says that urbicide follows an anti-urban logic inherent in the politics of ethnic nationalism:

Insofar as urbanity, and in particular the buildings that are its conditions of possibility, reveals the ineluctably shared and heterogeneous nature of existence (our being-in-common), it comprises a constant, agonistic provocation to the ontopolitics of ethnic nationalism. In order to assert its appeal to an origin, ethnic nationalism thus strikes at the conditions of possibility of the agonism that constantly provokes it: the (built) things that constitute existence as fundamentally shared (a being-in-common).

Urbicide therefore shares the annihilatory character of genocide, but not its focus on human beings as the object of destruction.

Urbicide can also include non-military forms of urban destruction, such as white flight, urban renewal or gentrification, if they are "characterised by the widespread deliberate destruction of buildings in order to disavow of agonism in and through the constitution of antagonism."

== International law ==
As of now there is no explicit language mentioning urbicide in international and humanitarian law. As the term has been coined and interpreted only recently, during the Yugoslav war in the 1990s, it has not reached public consciousness and public discourse to such extent as to be an instantiated into international law. If genocide and urbicide, however, are synonymous terms, as some theorists propose, it could be argued that urbicide is already prohibited by international law. It can also be argued that urbicide, as destruction of urban spaces and human habitations, is made illegal under international law and humanitarian law through the effects of other laws dealing with destruction of human-made environment and people's dependency upon it. Such laws are the rights to adequate housing, the right to life and privacy, to mental integrity, and to the freedom of movement. The most salient example of Sarajevo, where the term urbicide partly originated, clearly demonstrates the violation of these basic human rights on the civilian population of the city. Testimonies of the urbicide in Sarajevo, in the cultural production of confessional literature during the siege, clearly show the dramatic plunge in the standard of living, the overtaking and militarization of the public space, and the daily struggle of the citizens to get basic supplies such as food and water. In other cases, such as the Porta Farm evacuation and demolition of settlements by the Harare local government, there is evidence of violation of these basic human rights as specified by the International Law and the International Covenant on Economic, Social and Cultural Rights. Despite the specified violations, however, it might be useful to apply, as with genocide, the umbrella term urbicide for these and other cases of urban destruction.

The prospects for a codified prohibition of urbicide might benefit from differentiating the term's legal articulation from human rights law, just as urbicide conceptually separates itself from human rights. With the city as the site of urbicide, the traditional nation-state parties to international legislation might not suffice alone as stake-holders in any legal process, customary or otherwise. However, too much localizing of the criminalization of urbicide risks exonerating by inaction the governments often implicated as aggressors against the city and its citizens. It is often against their power interest to prosecute urbicide or to establish any form of judicial framework that deals explicitly with violations of such nature.

The inclusion of governments into the process is desirable, but their willingness to submit to another kind of scrutiny: particularly under the broad definitions of structural violence that often enter discourses on urbicide. They could presumably make their way into the legal discourses, as well.

The lack of explicit terminology that would address the destruction of cities in legal terms on the international level makes it unlikely that the international courts will take the issue more seriously. The problem is also with the enforcement of these laws on the international level, which have previously unenforced, even the human rights laws already in place.

Decisions of the International court, such as the case of reparations to Bosnia by the Serbian government for crimes against humanity, in which the court, in February 2007, acquitted Serbia of the duty to give reparations, perhaps demonstrate the further need to distinguish between urbicide and genocide. In the case of Sarajevo, where the case of genocide, as legally understood, could not be unequivocally applied to cases such as the Siege of Sarajevo, the concept of urbicide might provide a better interpretive framework for the violence inflicted upon the Sarajevo populace and their urban environment, such as the shared public space and the architecture of the city. The goal of such violence may have not been to destroy a minority population and their cultural and symbolic space, as in cases of genocide but to fragment the heterogeneous population of the city into homogeneous enclaves based on the ethnicity of the population. Thus, the violence is not directed towards an ethnicity per se, but towards the city as a heterogeneous space where different cultural identities can live and interact without antagonism.

== See also ==
- Bombing of São Paulo
- Counterurbanization
- Domicide
- Structural violence
