= Robert B. C. Noorduyn =

Dutch-Canadian aerospace engineer (1893–1959)

Robert B.C. Noorduyn
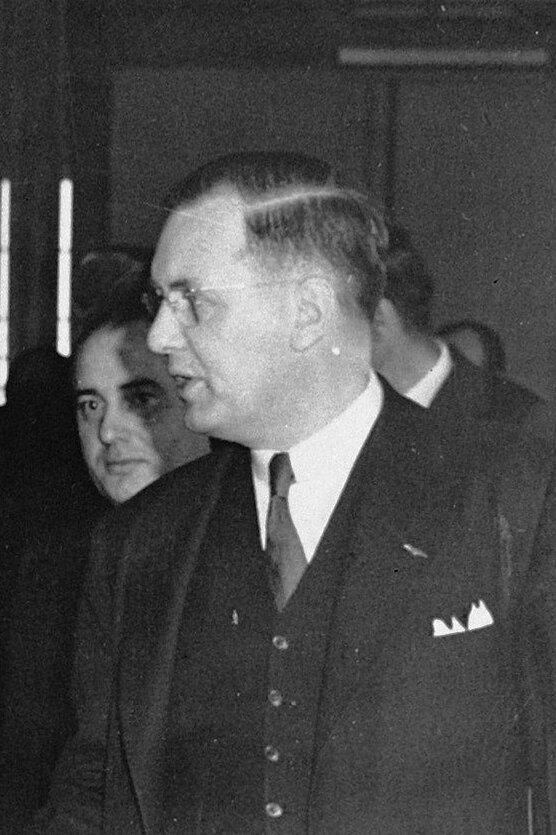
- Robert B.C. Noorduyn c.1940
- Born: April 6, 1893; Nijmegen, the Netherlands
- Died: February 22, 1959 (aged 65); South Burlington, Vermont
- Occupations: Engineer; Businessman
- Spouse: Bertha Noorduyn (Piggott)
- Children: Robert Hancock Noorduyn (1922–2008)
- Parent(s): Harriet Ellen Churchill; Bernardus Noorduijn

Robert Bernard Cornelis Noorduyn (April 6, 1893 – February 22, 1959) was a Dutch-born American aircraft designer and manufacturer. He is best known for the Noorduyn Norseman, a legendary Canadian bush plane produced in the 1930s to 1940s and again in the 1950s.

== Early life ==
Noorduyn was born in Nijmegen, Netherlands, to a Dutch father, Bernardus Noorduijn (1860–1910), and an English mother, Harriet Ellen Churchill.

In 1913, after having received technical training in the Netherlands and Germany, Noorduyn moved to England. There he trained to fly in a Caudron G.2 and worked as a technical draughtsmen for the Sopwith company.

In 1917, Noorduyn was recruited to become the chief draughtsman for the British Aerial Transport company. (Chief designer of the company was another Dutchman: along with Frits Koolhoven) British Aerial Transport or BAT however was short-lived. A victim of the changing tides following the end of World War I, it folded in 1919. By that time however, Anthony Fokker had returned from Germany and established a new factory in the Netherlands. Noorduyn returned just as well and found work with Fokker. Since Fokker wanted to expand into the USA, the company sent Noorduyn in 1921 to Teterboro to supervise a new manufacturing plant.

== Designs ==
In Teterboro, Noorduyn was responsible for the Fokker Universal, a popular utility transport that was particularly suitable for northern conditions. Many examples were sold to Canadian air carriers. The Fokker Universal and its follow-up Super Universal helped open the frontiers, fostering settlement and development of the north. In addition, Noorduyn worked on the re-design of the single-engine Fokker F.VIII into a twin-engined version.

Noorduyn moved at the beginning of 1929 to Bellanca in Wilmington, Delaware, where he designed the Bellanca Skyrocket. He was also heavily involved in the design of an improved version of the Bellanca Pacemaker, another favourite of bush flyers in Canada.

In 1932, while at the Pitcairn-Cierva Autogyro Company of America, Noorduyn was responsible for the design of the first enclosed, four-seater autogiro, the Pitcairn PA-19.

== Noorduyn Norseman ==
Having worked on designs at Fokker, Bellanca and Pitcairn-Cierva, Noorduyn created his own design in 1934, the Noorduyn Norseman. Along with colleague Walter Clayton, Noorduyn created the company Noorduyn Aircraft Limited in early 1933 at Montreal. A successor company bearing the name Noorduyn Aviation, was later established in 1935.

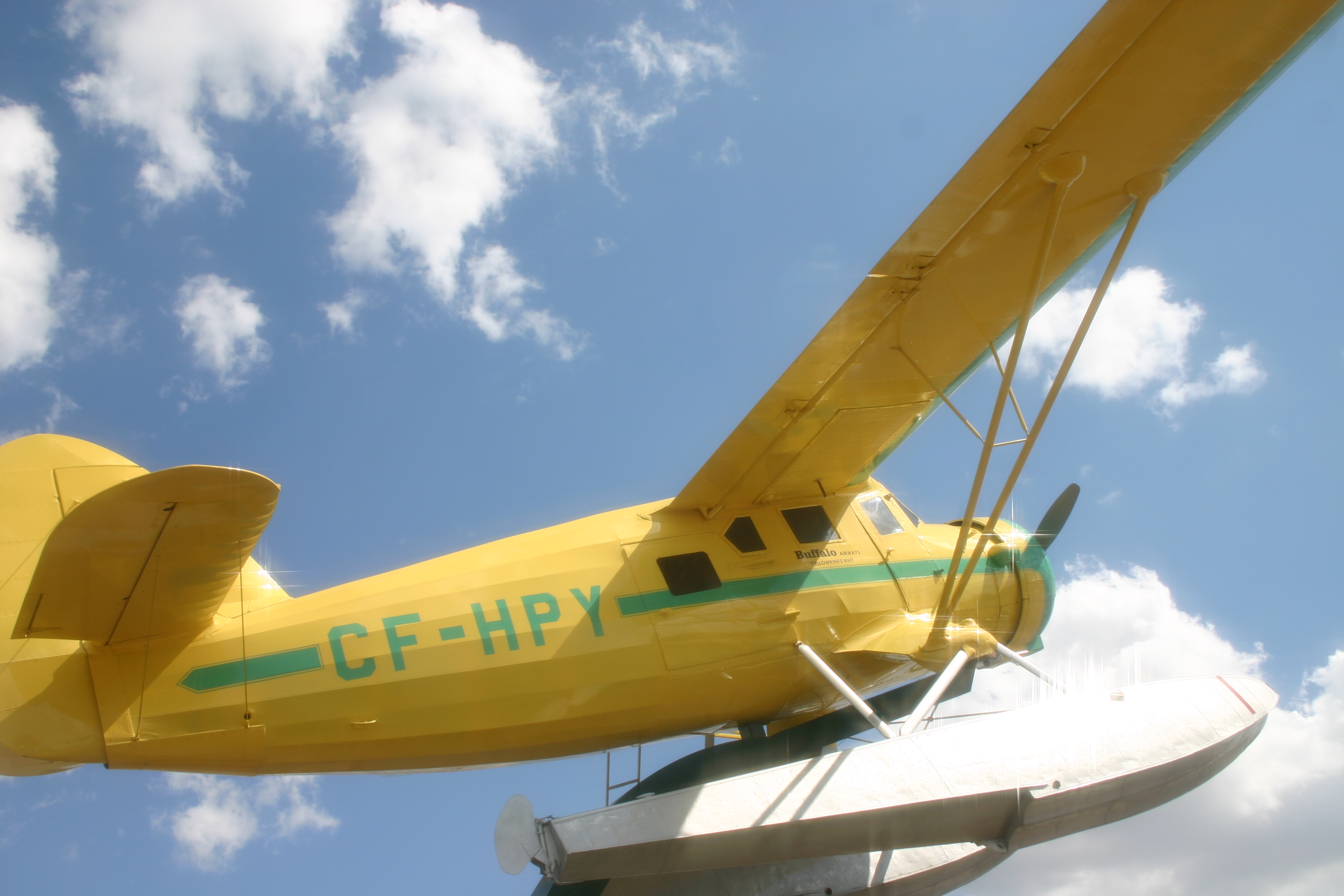
Noorduyn Norseman "CF-HBY" on display at the Alberta Aviation Museum, Edmonton, Alberta

Noorduyn's bush plane design revolved around a few basic criteria: it should be an aircraft with which a Canadian operator utilizing existing talents, equipment, and facilities could make money; it should be a high-wing monoplane to facilitate loading and unloading of passengers and cargo at seaplane docks and airports; and it should be an all-around superior aircraft to those in contemporary use in Canada. The final design layout looked much like one of the Fokker models with all-welded steel tubing fuselage structure and wood stringers were applied to it for attachment of a fabric skin. The wing was all-wood construction and fabric-covered except for the flaps and ailerons, which were made of welded steel tubing. The resulting utility bush plane, known as the Norseman, flew for the first time in 1936. Since then it has been used as both a military and civil cargo aircraft.

== Final years ==
In 1953, Noorduyn headed a group of investors who bought back the jigs and equipment from Canadian Car & Foundry and started a new company called Noorduyn Norseman Aircraft Ltd. Bob Noorduyn became ill and died in his home in South Burlington, Vermont, on February 22, 1959, but the company he had created, provided support for operating Norseman aircraft and built three new Mk Vs before selling its assets in 1982 to Norco Associates. Norco provided service only, as the manufacture of a new Norseman aircraft, being very labor-intensive, made it very expensive.
