= Fokker Universal =

Aircraft built by Fokker between 1926 -1931

Universal
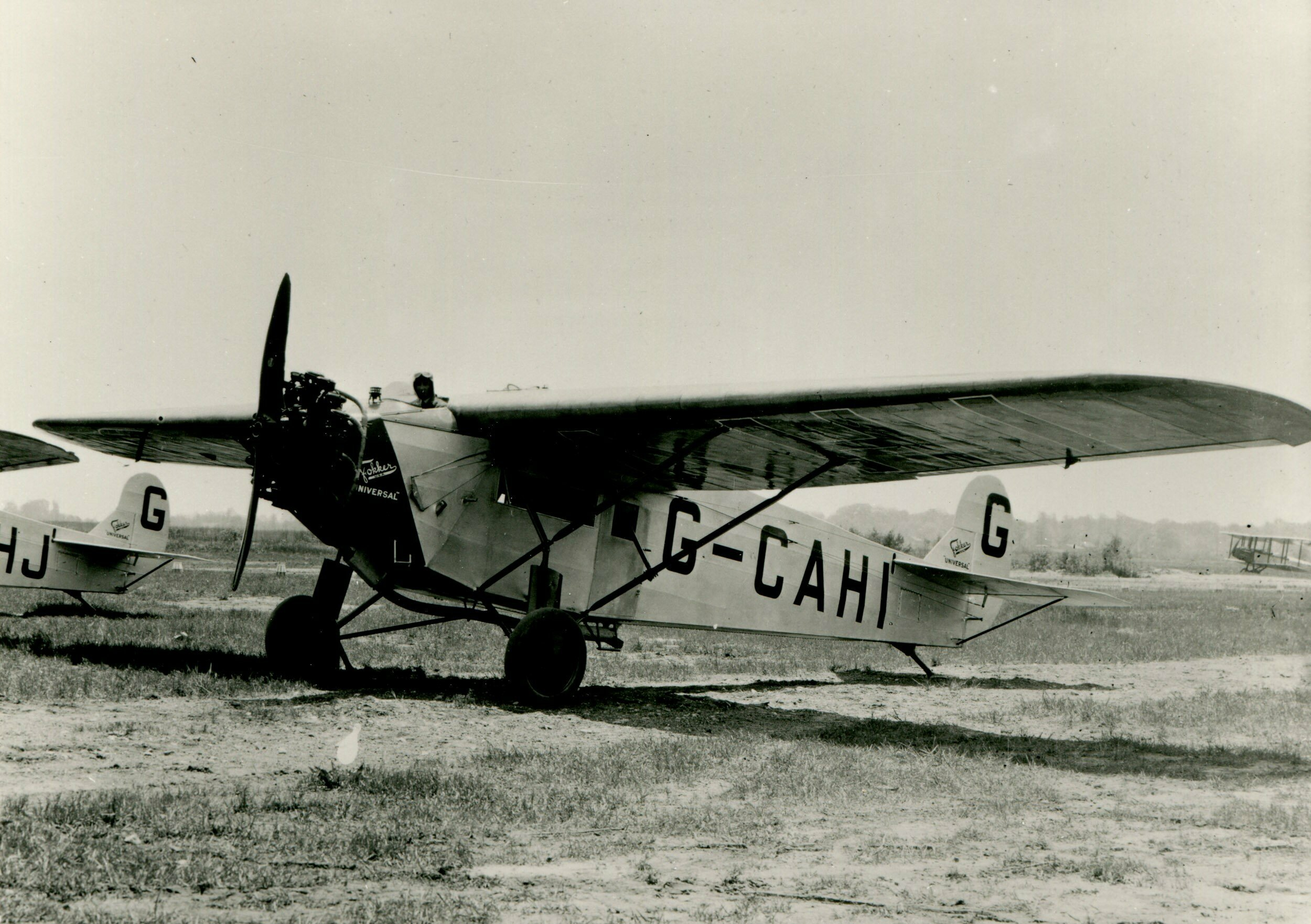
- A Canadian-registered Fokker Universal

General information
- Type: Airliner, Utility aircraft
- Manufacturer: Fokker Aircraft Company (Atlantic Aircraft Corporation)
- Designer: Robert B.C. Noorduyn
- Number built: 44

History
- Manufactured: 1926-1931
- Introduction date: 1926
- Developed into: Fokker Super Universal

The Fokker Universal was the first aircraft built in the United States that was based on the designs of Dutch-born Anthony Fokker, who had designed aircraft for Germany during World War I. About half of the 44 Universals that were built between 1926 and 1931 in the United States were used in Canada. Among the famous pilots who flew the Fokker Universal were Punch Dickins and Walter Gilbert.

== Design and development ==
Anthony Fokker established the Atlantic Aircraft Corporation at the Teterboro Airport in Teterboro, New Jersey. One of his first ventures for the new company was building other aircraft under license. In 1926, he formulated plans to create an original aircraft designed for utility and air transport. The design was spearheaded by Robert Noorduyn and based on conventional Fokker designs. The mixed-material construction featured a welded steel tube frame for the fuselage and tail surfaces that were covered in fabric as well as a large wing constructed of wood with a wingspan of 14.55 m, mounted above the fuselage. Although the overall design was quite "clean," all cables, horns and attachments were mounted externally, adding considerably to the drag.

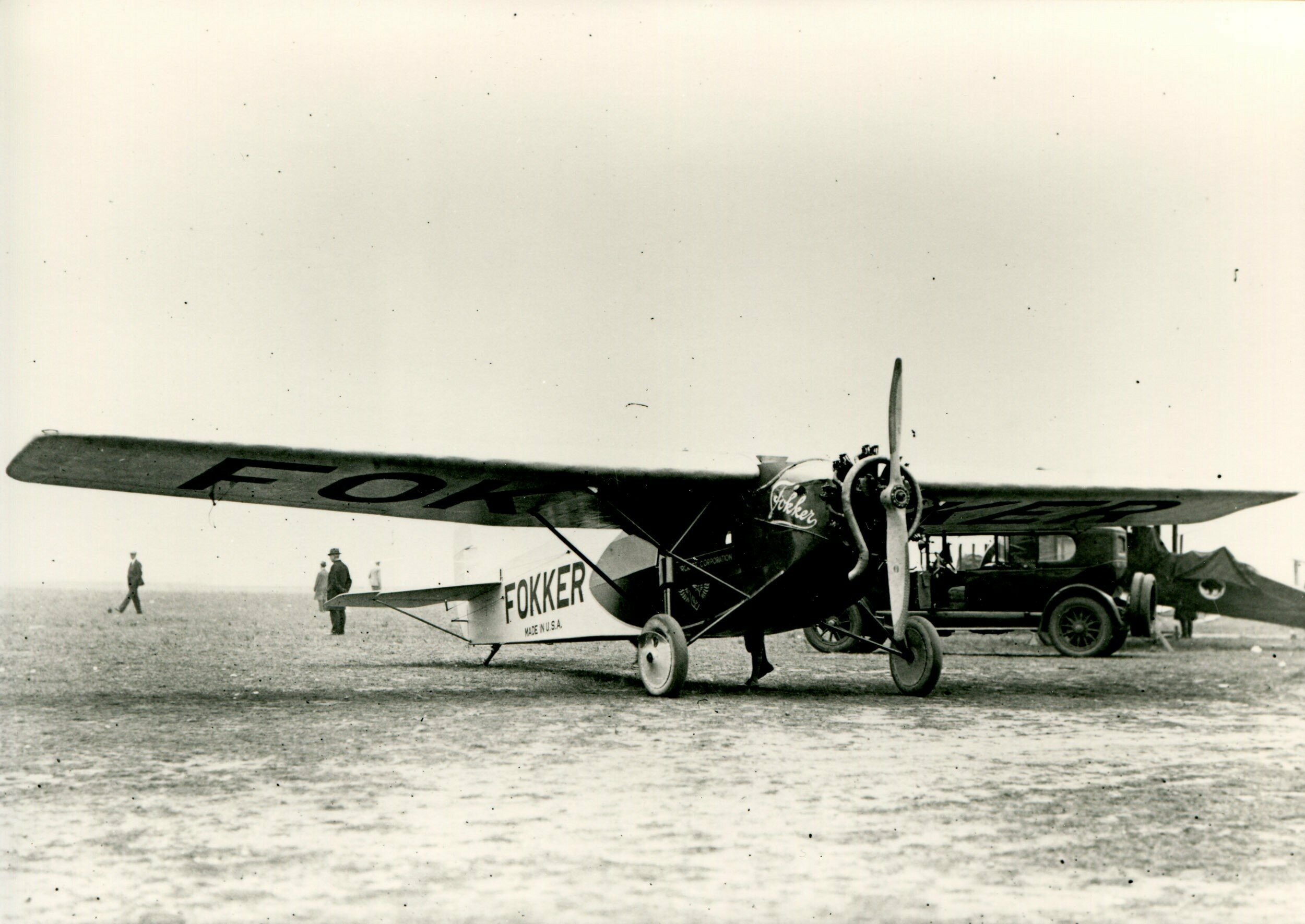
Prototype of the US-developed Fokker Universal

When the Fokker Universal (known within Fokker as the Model 4) was first developed in 1925, it had a 149 kW (200 hp) Wright J-4 or a 164 kW (220 hp) J-5 engine. The later Standard Universal version was powered by a 246 kW (330 hp) Wright J-6-9 engine. Two gasoline tanks were mounted in the wings near the forward edge. As typical of the era, the pilot sat in an open cockpit forward of the wing’s leading edge. The enclosed cabin below and to the rear of the pilot held four to six passengers or could be fitted for cargo hauling. Cargo capacity was estimated to be approximately 427 kg (940 lb); fuel capacity was 280 L (78 US gal) or 213 kg (468 lb)

They were sold new at the factory in 1927 for $14,200. At a time when Fokker America was mostly producing local versions of aircraft designed in the Netherlands, the Universal reversed this situation by becoming an American-designed aircraft produced by the parent company as the Fokker F.XI (although Fokker F.XI and Universal were not identical).

== Operational history ==
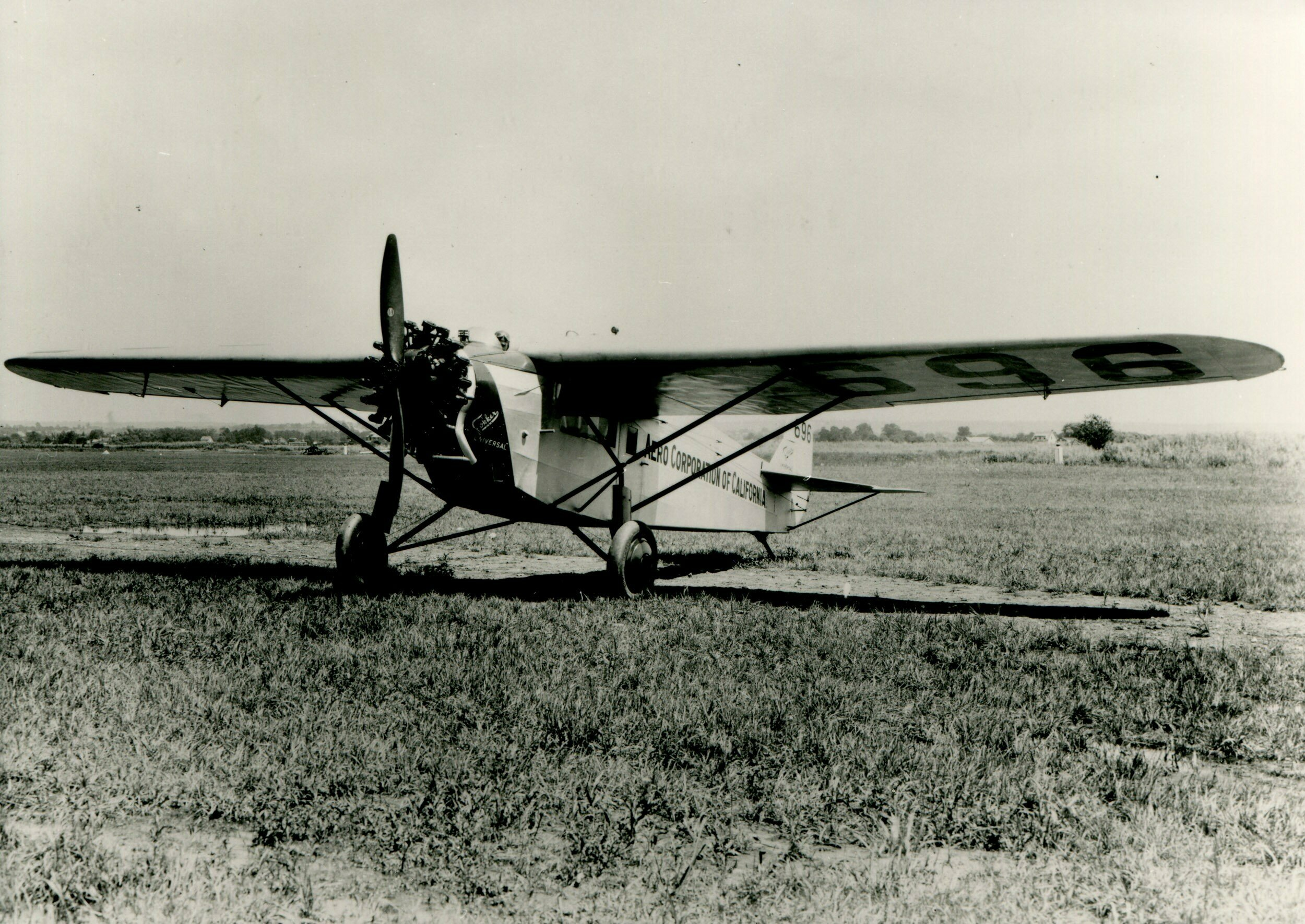
A Universal operated by the Aero Corporation of California.

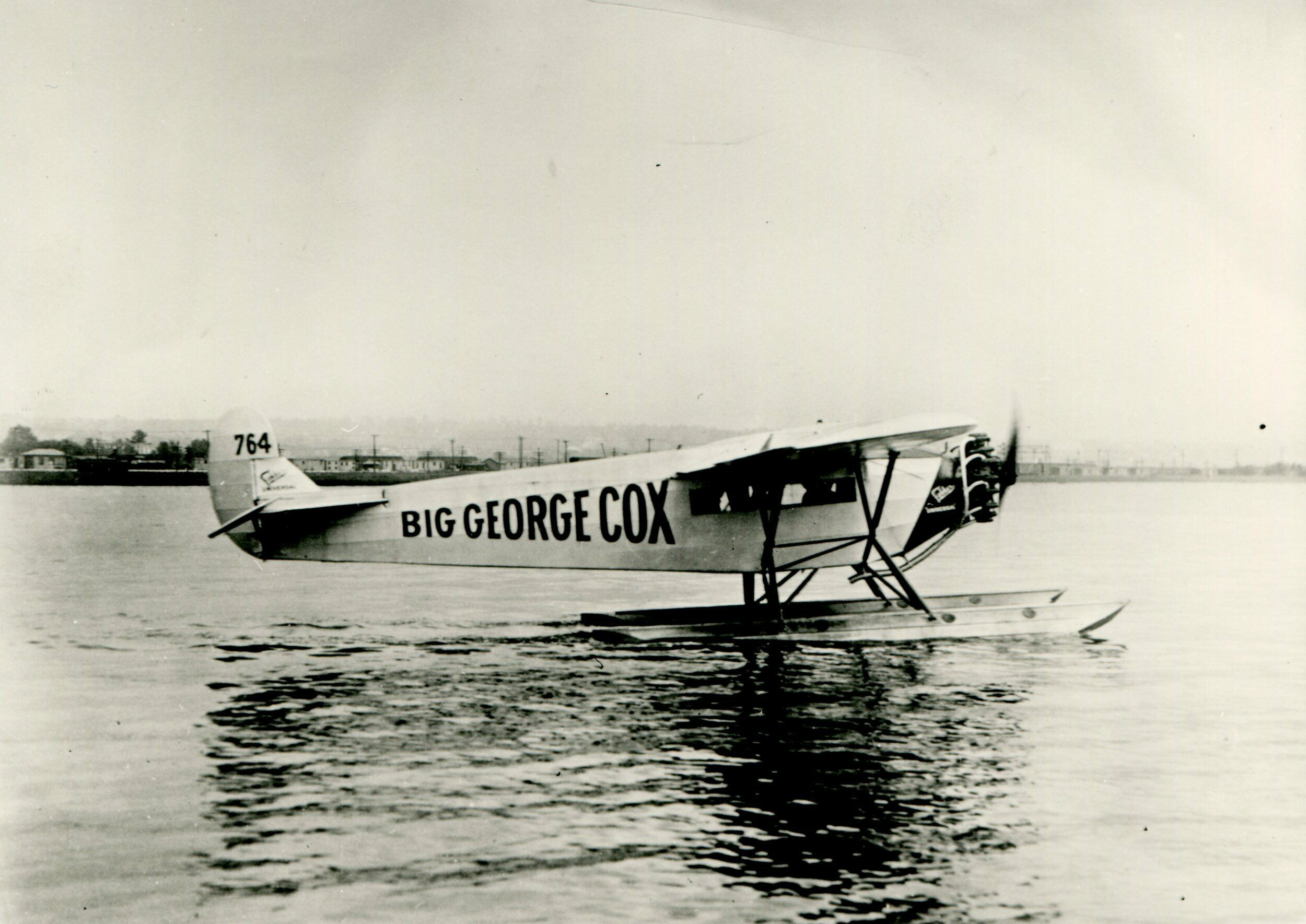
The airframe proved suitable as a seaplane outfitted with floats.

Powered by the newly developed, air-cooled Wright R-790 Whirlwind radial engine which proved to be reliable, the Universal became widely regarded as a good choice for small air carriers and operators. The rugged utility aircraft proved it could haul cargo or passengers and its unique shock absorber system made of bungee cords enabled it to land on bumpy and uneven landing strips. Configurations could be readily changed from landplane to seaplane equipped with floats or if fitted with skis, the Universal could be used on rough ice and snow surfaces. An order for 12 Universals was placed by Western Canada Airways when its owner, James Armstrong Richardson, Sr. judged that the Standard Universal was the best available transport for use in the northern regions of Canada. Six more Universals (G-CAHE - CAHJ) were ordered by the Canadian Government for use in the Hudson Strait Expedition (1927–1928) to study ice formation and navigation in the Hudson Strait prior to the building of the port of Churchill, Manitoba.

While not specifically designed for long-distance flights, the Universal was suitable for pioneering work. Charles Lindbergh had wanted to fly a Universal on his transatlantic flight but officials at the Atlantic Aircraft Corporation who reviewed his request in 1926, thought that Lindbergh's plans were too risky. More concerned about the company's reputation rather than the pilot's well-being, they would not sell him an aircraft.

The Universal provided steady if unspectacular service with more than half of the Universals utilized for bush flying while more than a dozen United States, Canadian and foreign airlines flew it as a passenger/cargo transport. A further development, the Super Universal was larger and more refined with a fully enclosed cockpit. The follow-up design soon supplanted the Universal on the Atlantic Aircraft Corporation's production lines.

Universals continued to fly well into the 1930s but were primarily relegated to cargo work.

== Surviving aircraft ==
Fokker Standard Universal G-CAJD is also known as "The Ghost of Charron Lake". It was lost in a snow storm on 10 December 1931. After a 30-year search for the rare bush plane, it was discovered in 2005. A Western Canada Aviation Museum search team (the Fokker Aircraft Recovery Team, F.A.R.T.), using sophisticated side scan sonar technology, finally located the aircraft literally "parked" on the lake bottom. In July 2006, the Ghost's engine was returned to Winnipeg, along with several artifacts. In October, the underwater archaeology team returned to the recovery site and towed the tail section to shallower waters. A further expedition was undertaken in 2007 to recover more of the Fokker for future display at the museum. Larger and smaller components are presently in storage at the Western Canada Aviation Museum. A decision as to restoration or conservation of the recovered material has not been made at present.

The wreckage of Fokker Universal OE-DAA was rebuilt for Sir Reginal Ansett and painted as VH-UTO (First aircraft of Ansett Airlines) As of 2024 it is the centrepiece of the Sir Reginald Ansett Transport Museum of Hamilton Victoria Australia

Fokker Universal c/n 408, G-CAHE was abandoned on the shores of Cooking Lake, Alberta and gradually fell apart. Parts of the fuselage, engine, and horizontal stabilizer were collected and donated to the City of Edmonton Artifact Centre; these components are on display at the Alberta Aviation Museum.

Fokker Universal c/n 434, NC7029 was recovered from a field in New York by the Connecticut Aeronautical Historical Association (now the New England Air Museum). The remains include the fuselage (broken in two sections), landing gear, engine, and small fragments of the wings. The remains were then transferred to the Canada Aviation and Space Museum in Ottawa, Canada, who in turn transferred them to the Alberta Aviation Museum in 2024.

== Operators ==
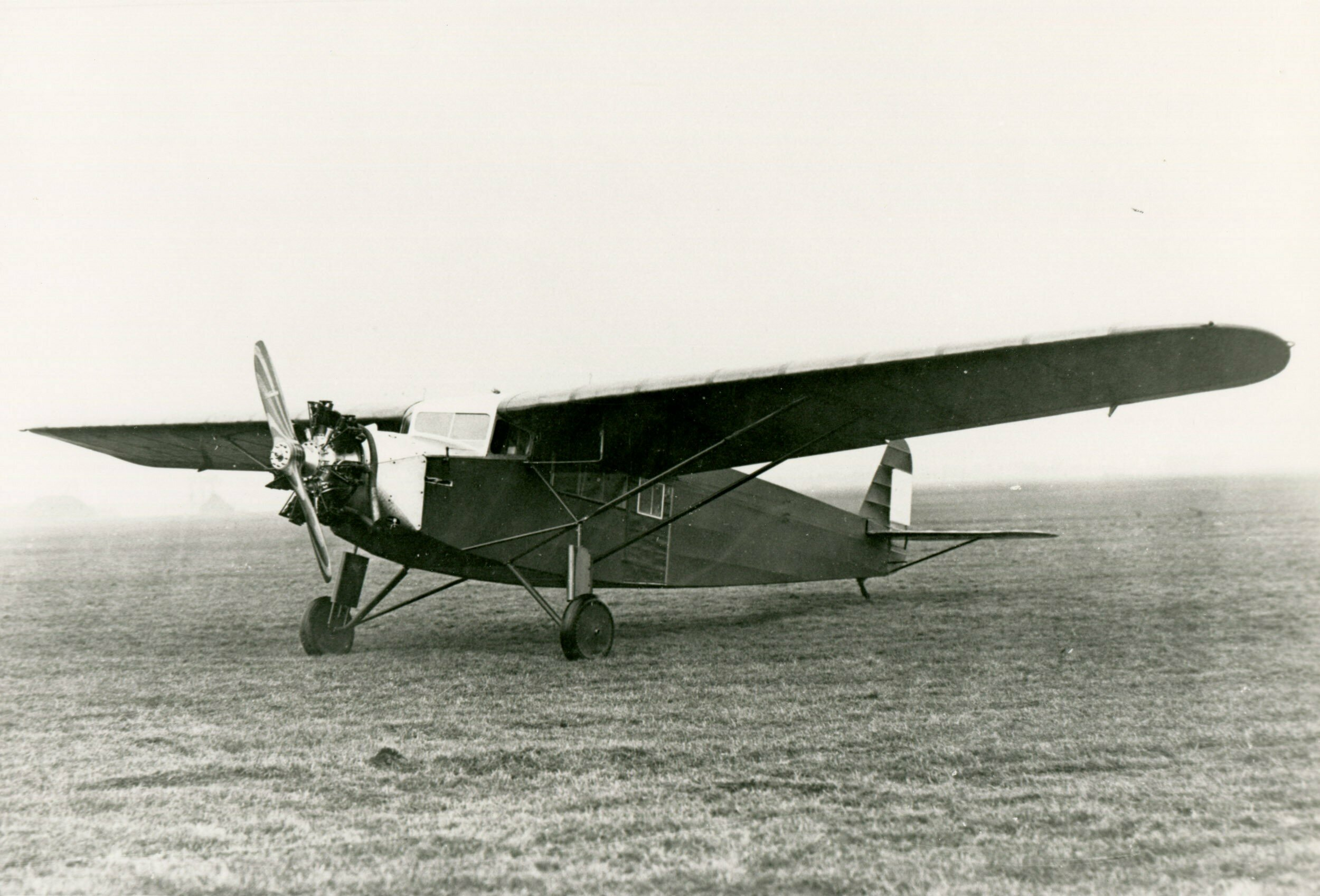
One of the F.XI prototypes would later see service with Swiss airline Alpar; seen here in 1929.

Australia

- Ansett Airways
- MacRobertson Miller Airlines

Canada

- Canadian Airways
- Canadian Colonial Airways
- Department of Marine and Fisheries (now Fisheries and Oceans Canada)
- Western Canada Airways
- Peace River Airways
- Independent Airways
- United Air Transport

Cuba

- Cuban Navy

Honduras

- Honduran Air Force

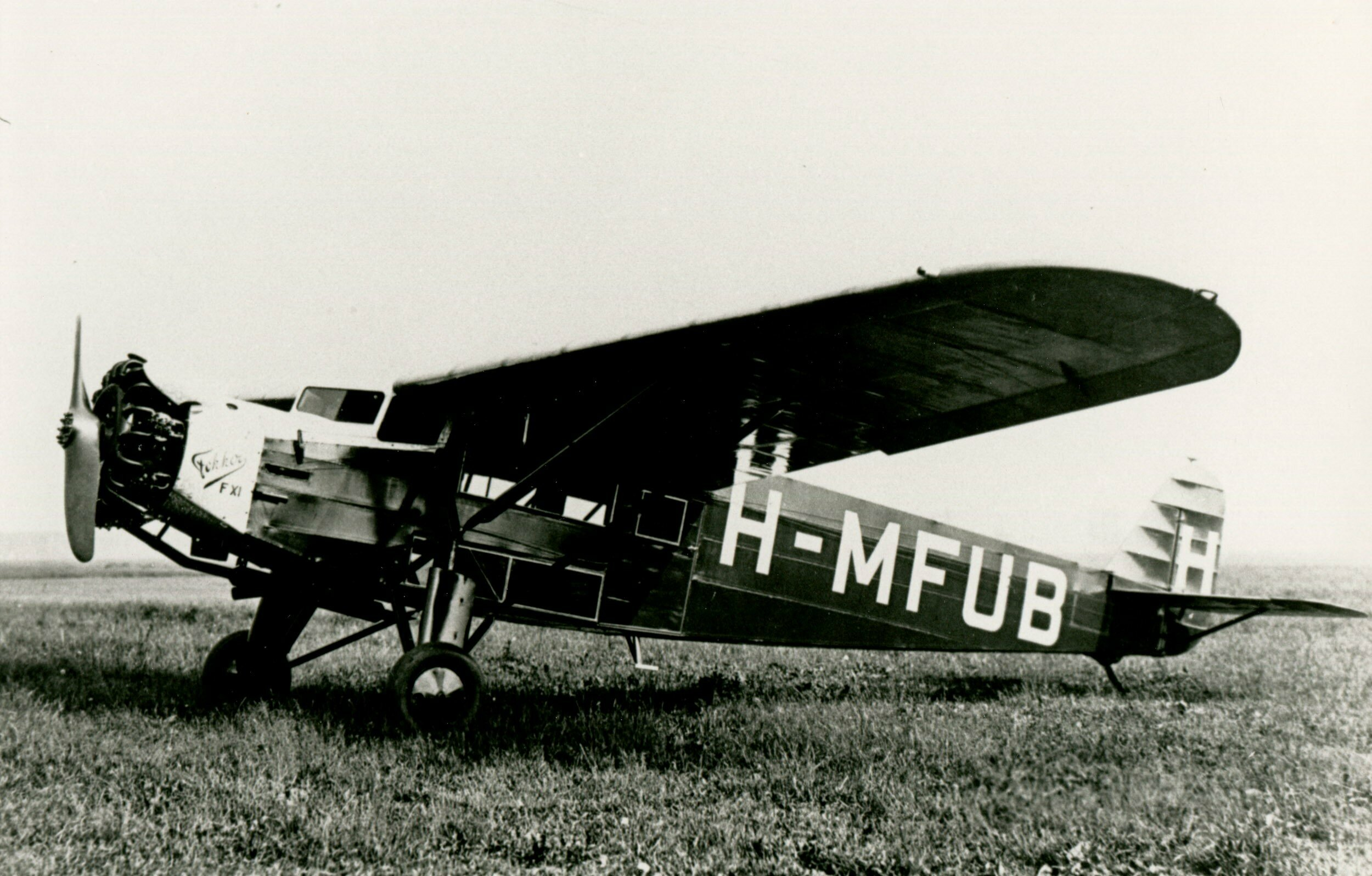
Fokker F.XI from MALÉRT airline

Hungary

- Hungarian Air Force (Fokker F.XI)

United States

- Colonial Air Transport
- National Parks Airways
- Pacific Air Transport
- Pure Oil
- Standard Air Lines

== Specifications (Fokker Universal) ==
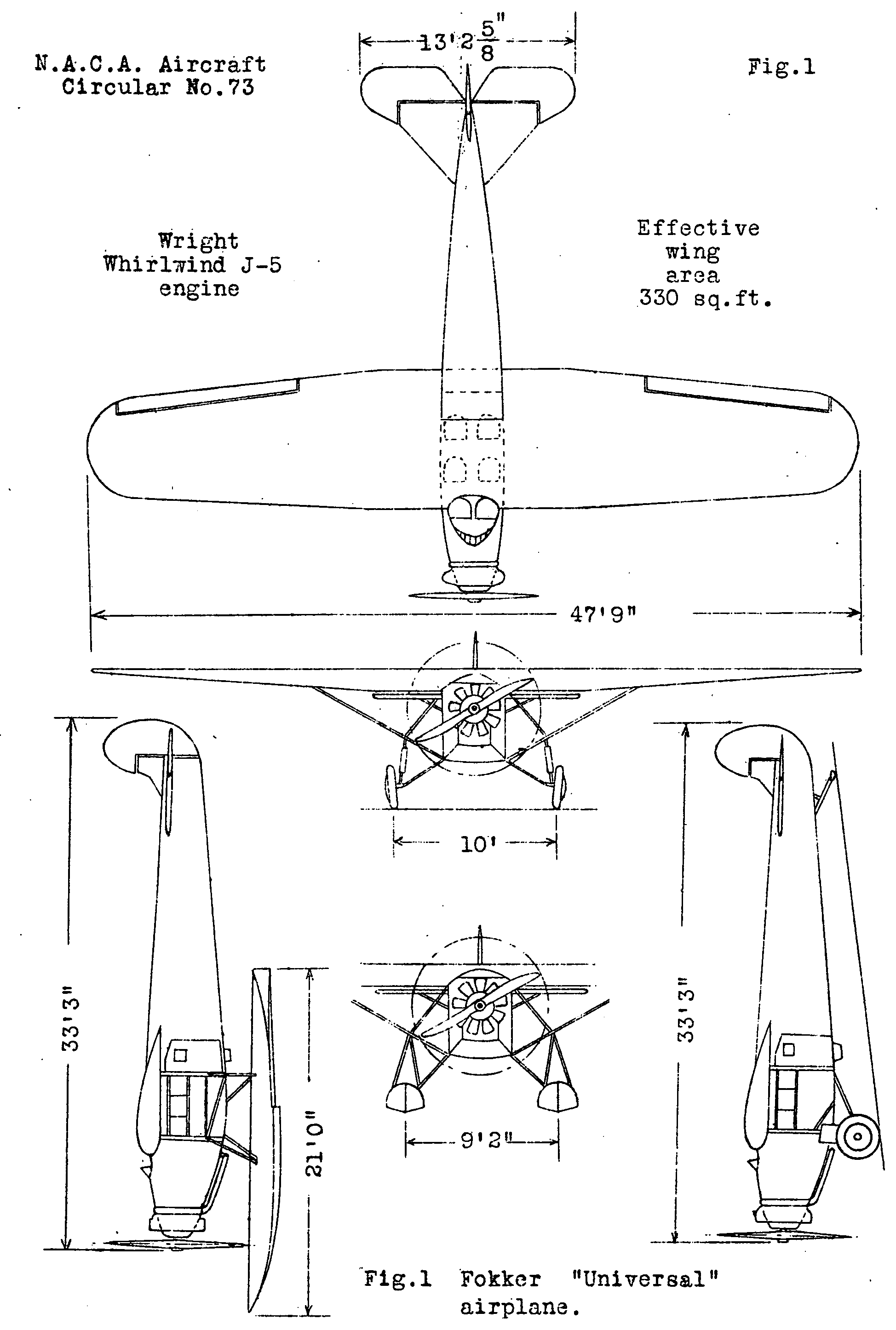
Fokker Universal 3-view drawing from NACA Aircraft Circular No.73

Data from "Inspection Handbook Part 5" (PDF). Regulatory and Guidance Library. Federal Aviation Administration. Archived from the original (PDF) on 12 February 2017. "Fokker". Aerofiles.

General characteristics

- Crew: One
- Capacity: 4 passengers or 940 lb / 427 kg cargo
- Length: 33 ft 3 in (10.13 m)
- Wingspan: 47 ft 9 in (14.56 m)
- Height: 8 ft 9 in (2.7 m)
- Wing area: 341 sq ft (31.68 m^{2})
- Empty weight: 2,192 lb (996 kg)
- Gross weight: 4,000 lb (1,818 kg)
- Powerplant: 1 × Wright J-5 radial engine, 220 hp (164 kW)
- Propellers: Hamilton-Standard fixed-pitch metal propeller

Performance

- Maximum speed: 118 mph (189 km/h, 103 kn)
- Cruise speed: 98 mph (158 km/h, 86 kn)
- Range: 500 mi (805 km, 439 nmi)
- Service ceiling: 12,000 ft (3,700 m)
