= Alberta Aviation Museum =

- Established: 1980; Grand Opening: 1992
- Location: Edmonton, Alberta
- Coordinates: 53°33′57″N 113°31′2″W
- Type: Aviation museum
- Visitors: 20,000
- Executive director: Jean Lauzon
- Website: Alberta Aviation Museum

The Alberta Aviation Museum is an aviation museum located in Edmonton, Alberta, Canada. The museum is located on-site at the former Edmonton City Centre (Blatchford Field) Airport on the southwest corner of the field (11410 Kingsway NW).

The museum operates daily except for Christmas Day, Boxing Day and New Years Day.

== History ==
The Alberta Aviation Museum is housed in the historic Hangar 14, one of the last two remaining examples of a 'double-double' Second World War British Commonwealth Air Training Plan (BCATP) hangar. These hangars, built for the BCATP across Canada, were made of pre-cut wooden timbers of British Columbia fir. They could be built as single units, double units, and the 'double-double' which is four units.

Hangars were built on the site from 1939 to 1942, including 3 double hangars for RCAF Station Edmonton, with one of the hangars originally opened 5 October 1940 as No. 2 Air Observers School (AOS) under the command of Wop May. Hangar 14 was completed in 1943 on a rectangular plan with an area of 6,689 square metres (72,000 ft^{2}) with a clear span of 34 metres (112 ft), and subdivided evenly by a firewall which acts as a support truss. After the United States entered the Second World War the airport was used to service United States Army Air Forces (USAAF) aircraft heading to Alaska until the new USAAF base that was to become CFB Namao (now CFB Edmonton) opened outside of Edmonton and absorbed some of the traffic. Following the war in 1946, Hangar 14 was used by No. 418 (City of Edmonton) Reserve Squadron, Pacific Western Airlines and for Distant Early Warning Line (DEW Line) construction before becoming a car dealership in the late 1960s.

Known in Edmonton as "The Hangar on Kingsway", it has been designated 'M' Hangar, Hangar #6 and later Building #14 by the Edmonton City Airport. Hangar 14 was designated a Provincial Historic Resource under the Historical Resources Act on July 4, 2000, and a Municipal Historic Resource by the City of Edmonton on August 31, 2004.

A Boeing 737 owned by the museum was broken into and had parts stolen from it in August 2014.

=== Current ===
The building has been designated as a municipal and provincial historic resource. Despite its historic resource status, a recent motion put forward by City administration has revealed that the hangar is in need of structural upgrades, and requires a minimum of forty-one million dollars for repairs by 2027. It was initially motioned by administration that the building be de-accessioned from the city's heritage properties, which could result in the museum having to move (despite renewing a 25-year lease in 2018). Councilor Anne Stevenson countered this with a motion to propose a two-year timeline to determine creative solutions for the building with the end goal of the museum remaining where it is. The Alberta Aviation Museum is currently working with the City to determine a plan forward. In July 2022, the city began a two year effort to sell the hangar. Following the destruction of Hangar 11 in a fire in April 2024, the museum again requested that ownership of Hangar 14 be transferred to them.

The museum hosts several groups including the 504 Blatchford Field Squadron, Royal Canadian Air Cadets, the 180 (20th Field Artillery Regiment, RCA) Royal Canadian Army Cadets, 700 (City of Edmonton) Wing, Royal Canadian Air Force Association, and 418 (City of Edmonton) Squadron Association, and CASARA.

== Collection ==
=== Aircraft ===
Type	Identity
Avro Anson II	11567
Avro Canada CF-100 Canuck	100476
Barkley-Grow T8P-1	CF-BLV
Beechcraft Model 18	C-FRSX
Canadair Sabre	19101
Canadair CT-133 Silver Star	21146 as "21533"
Canadair CT-133 Silver Star (Composite)	21506
Cranwell CLA.4	
Curtiss JN-4	C-GDCX / 3793
Curtiss "Stinson Special" (replica)	
de Havilland Mosquito	VP189
de Havilland DH.60 Moth (on loan)	G-CYYG
de Havilland Tiger Moth	C-GDWI (241)
Fairchild 71	CF-ATZ
Fleet Canuck	C-FMHW
Ford Trimotor (float only)	CF-BEP
Fokker D.VIII (replica)	
Fokker Universal	G-CAHE
Lockheed F-104 Starfighter	D-5805 (Netherlands)
McDonnell CF-101 Voodoo 100060
McDonnell CF-101 Voodoo 100032 (restored as 17425)
Noorduyn Norseman	CF-EIH
Noorduyn Norseman	CF-HPY
North American B-25 Mitchell	5273 as FW251
Piper PA-18 Super Cub	C-FPGD
Stinson Reliant	C-FOAY
Vickers Viking (7/8-scale replica)	G-CAEB (Replica)
Waco UIC	CF-AAW
Westland Lysander (2/3-scale replica) (loaned out)	

=== Helicopters ===
Type	Identity
Bell 47
Bell 206	C-FQZB restored as C-GDXC

== Gallery ==
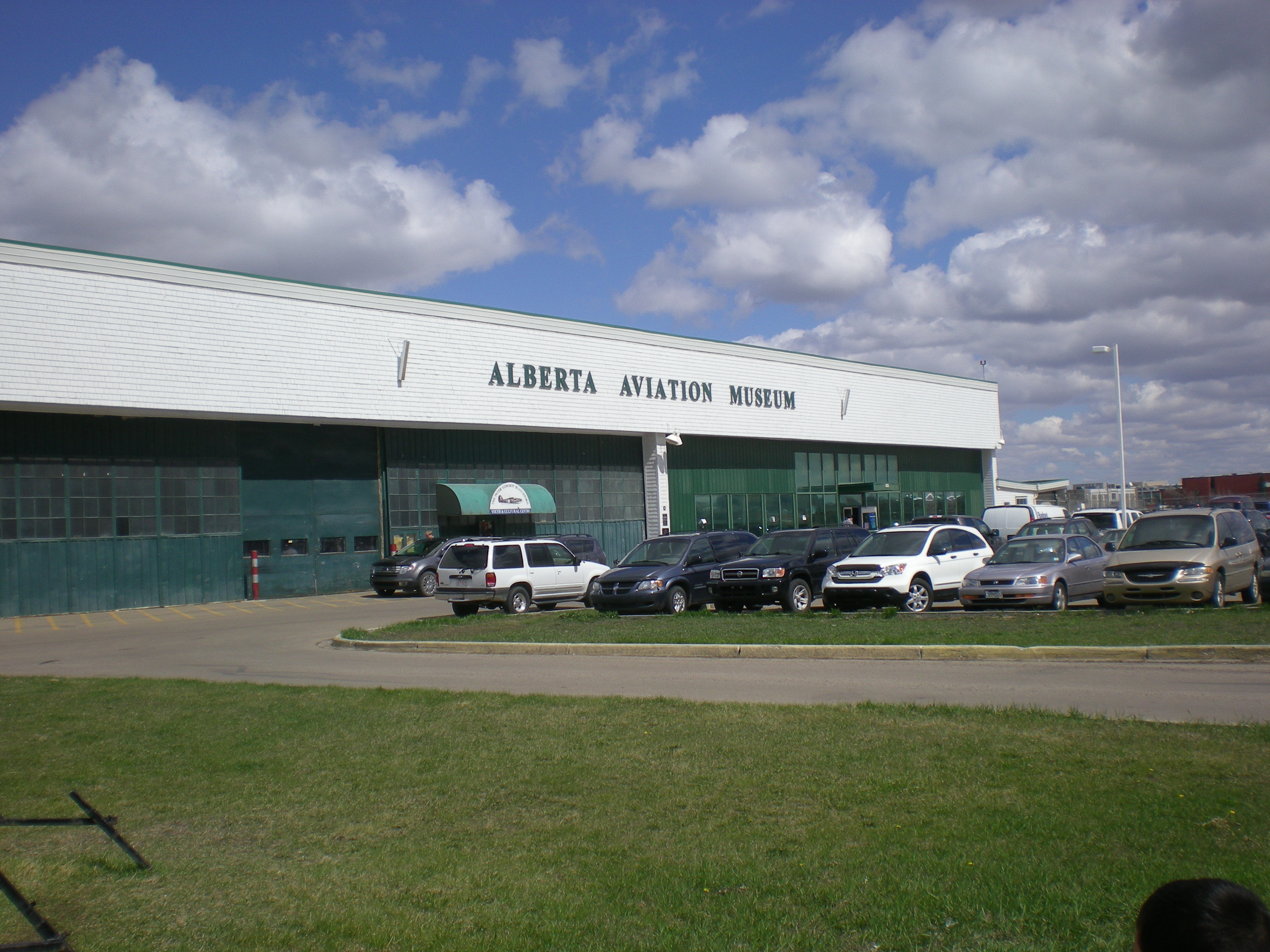

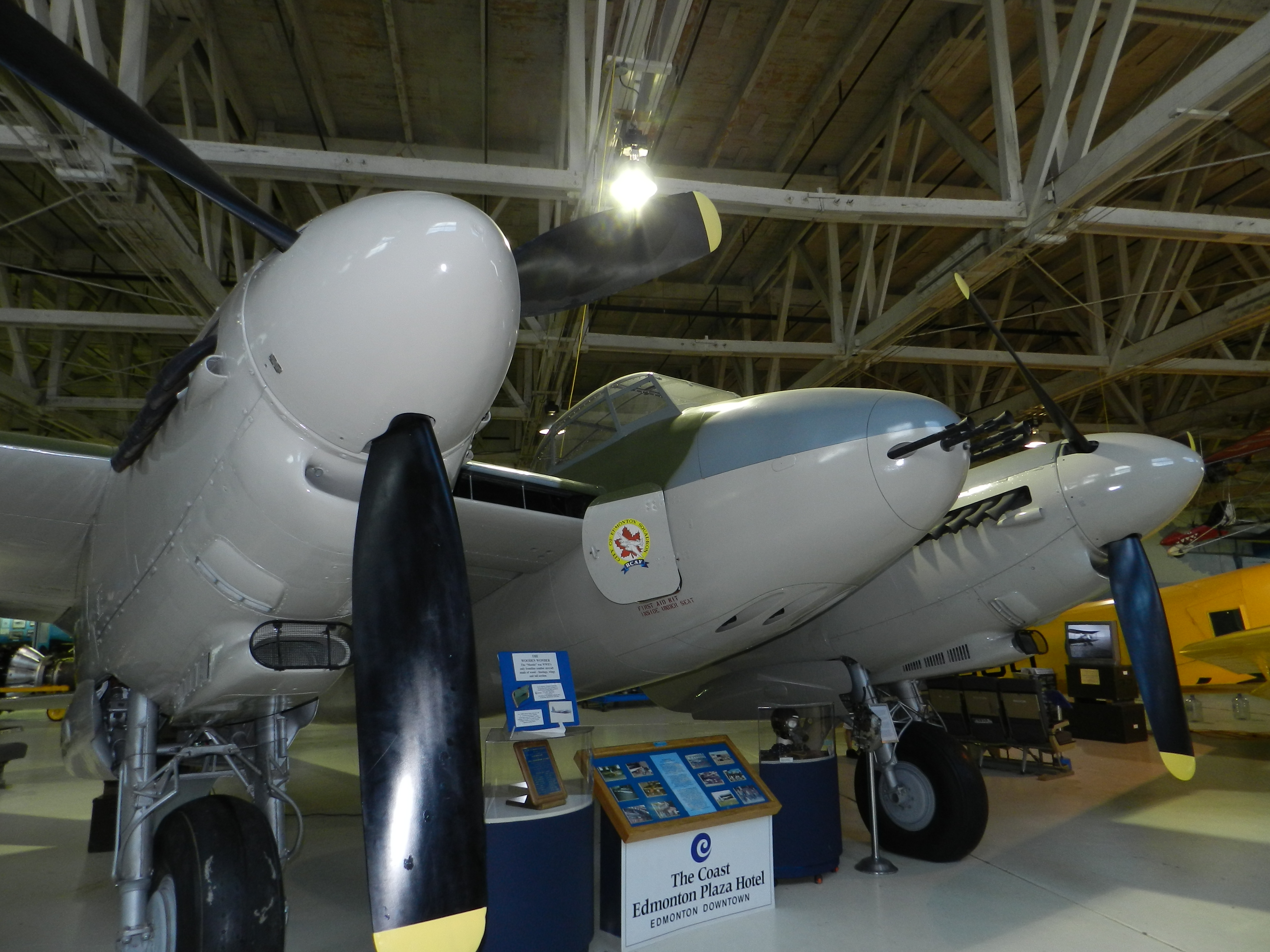

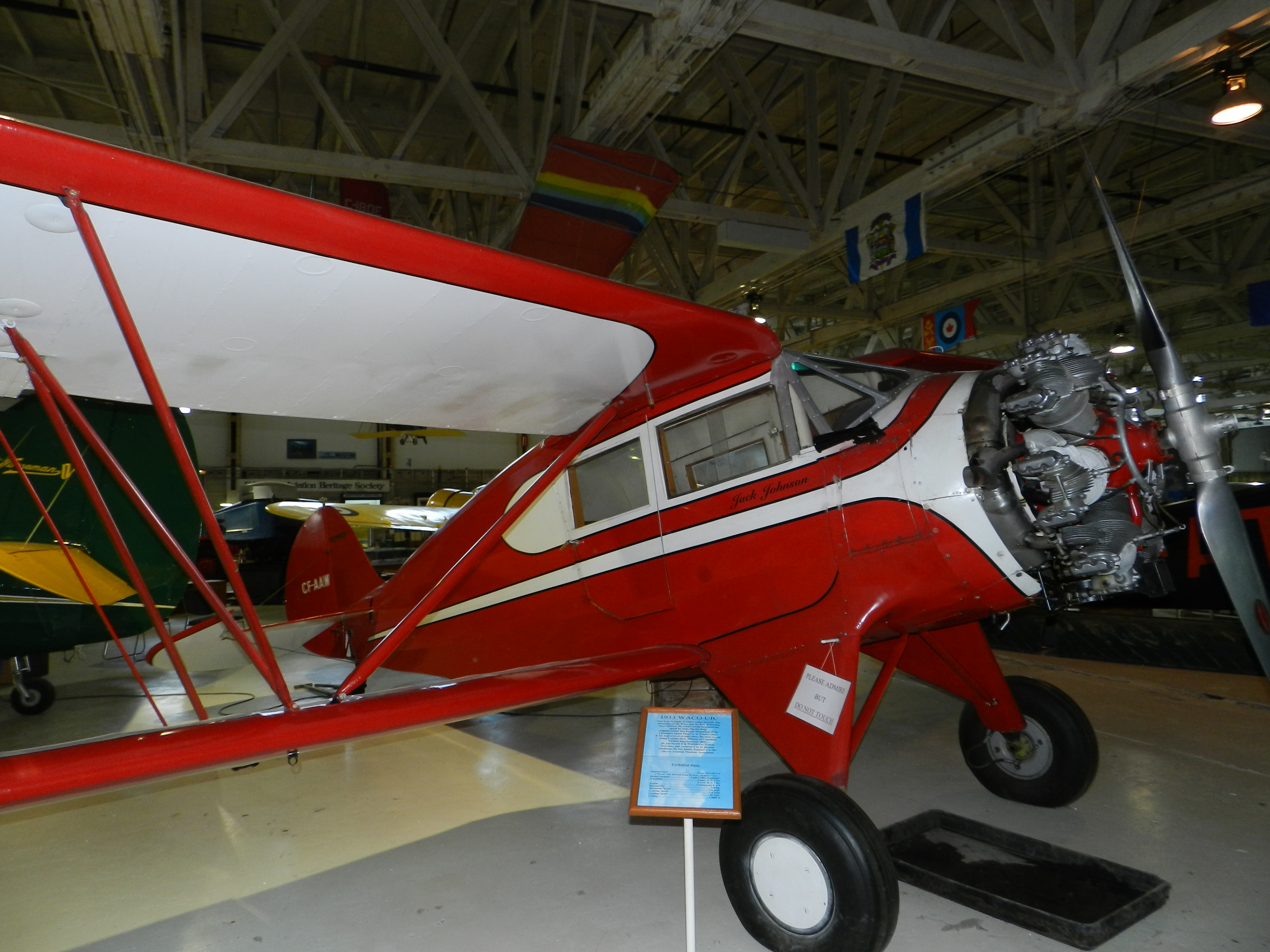

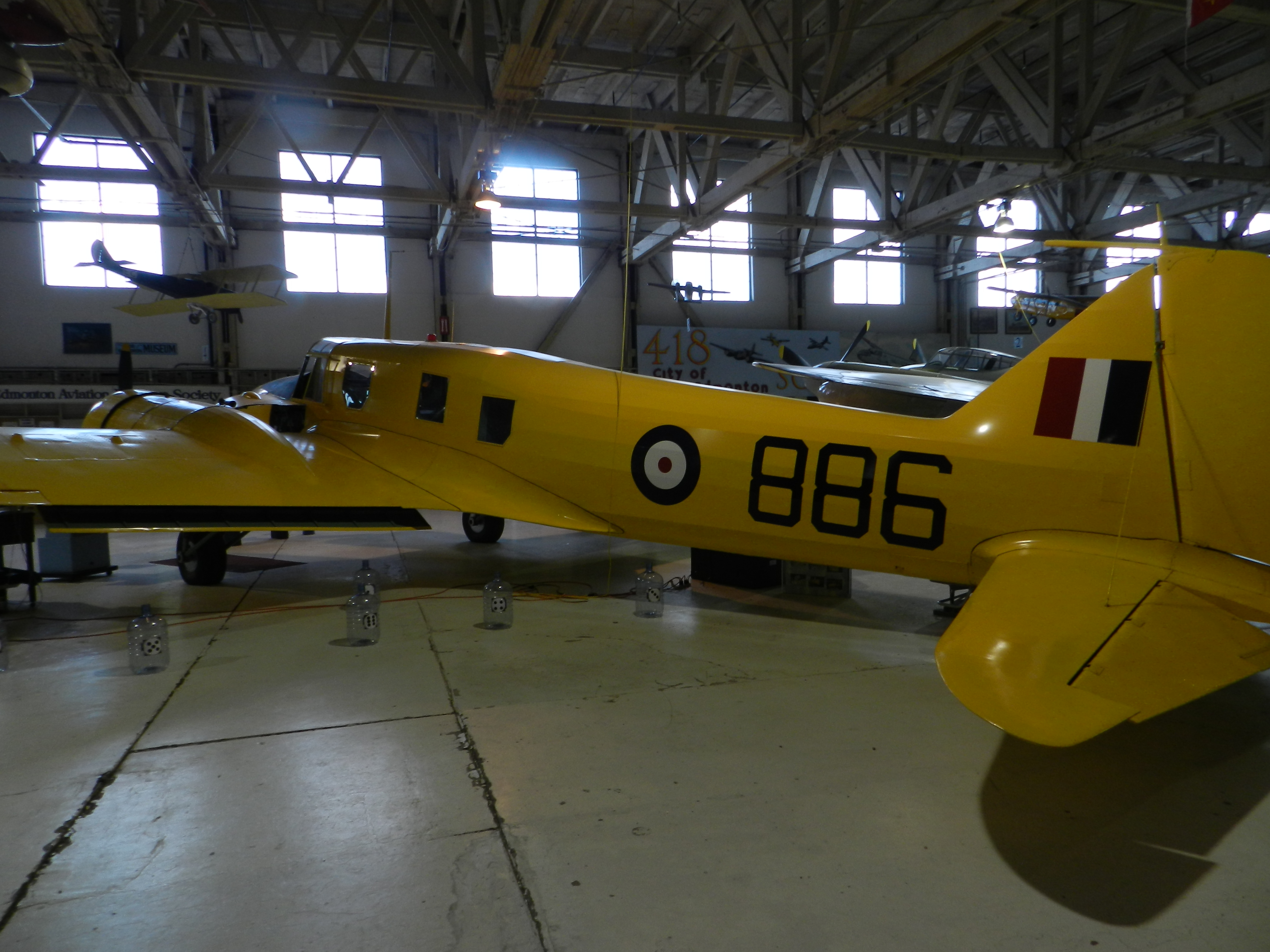

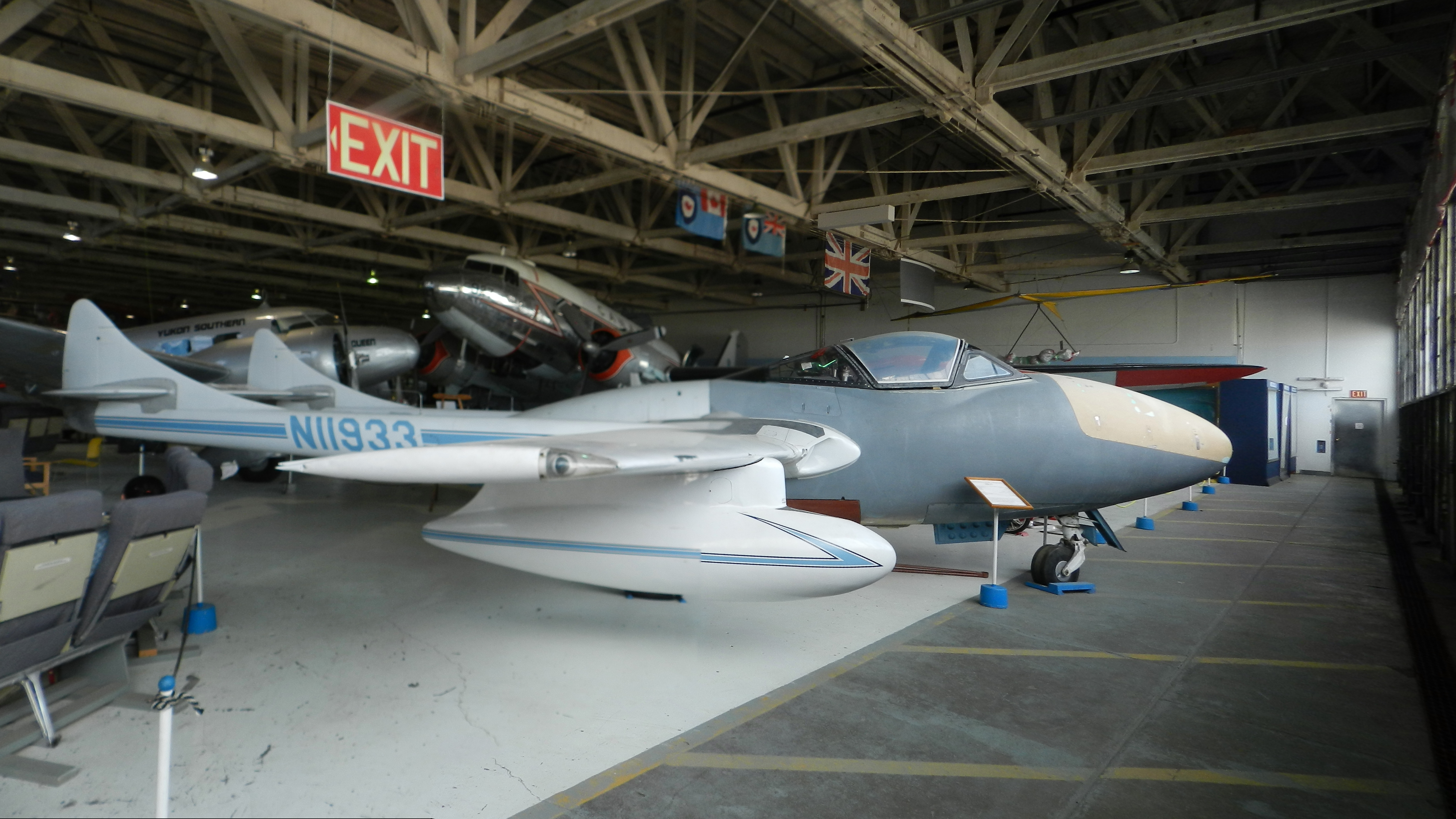

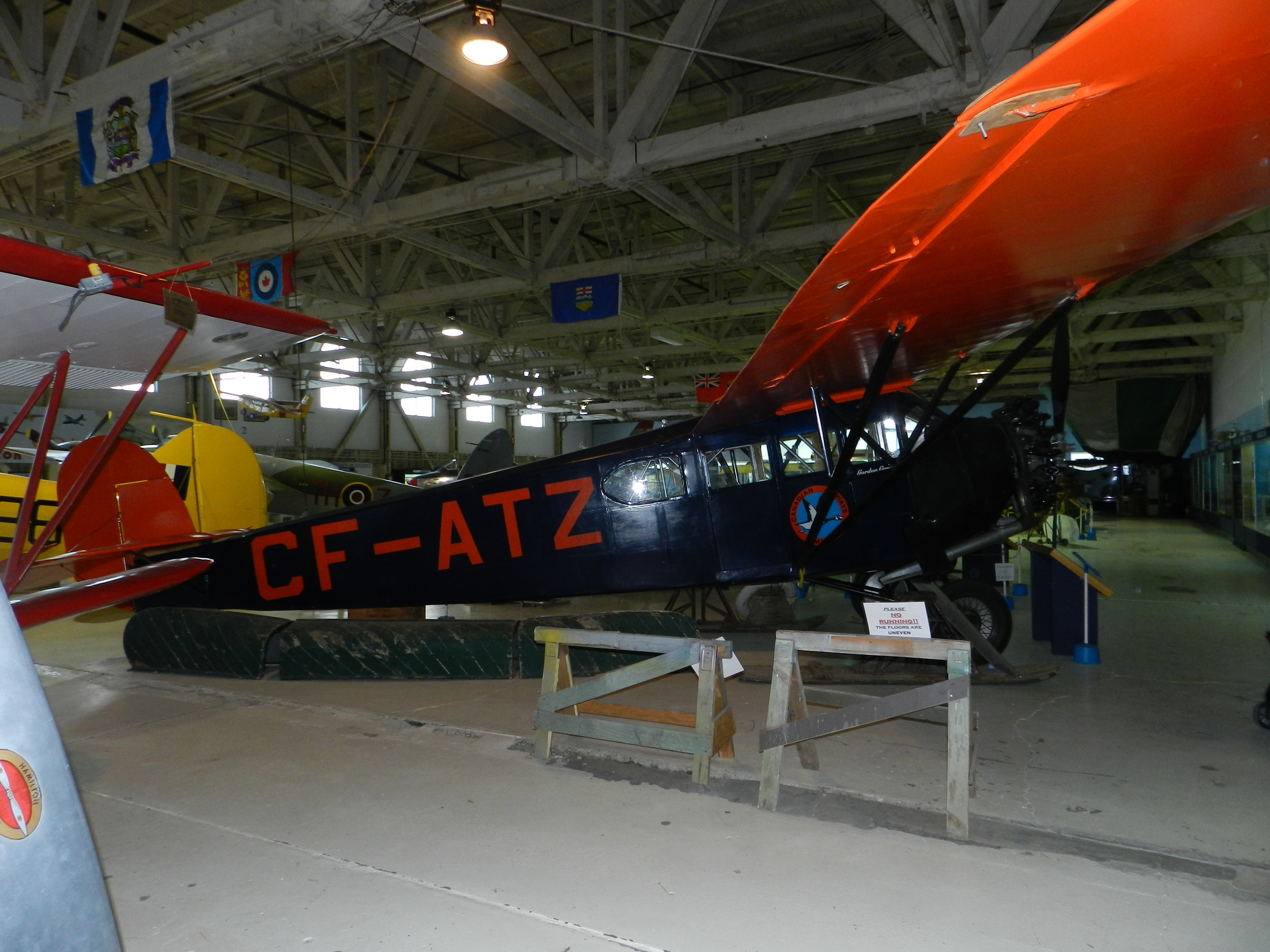

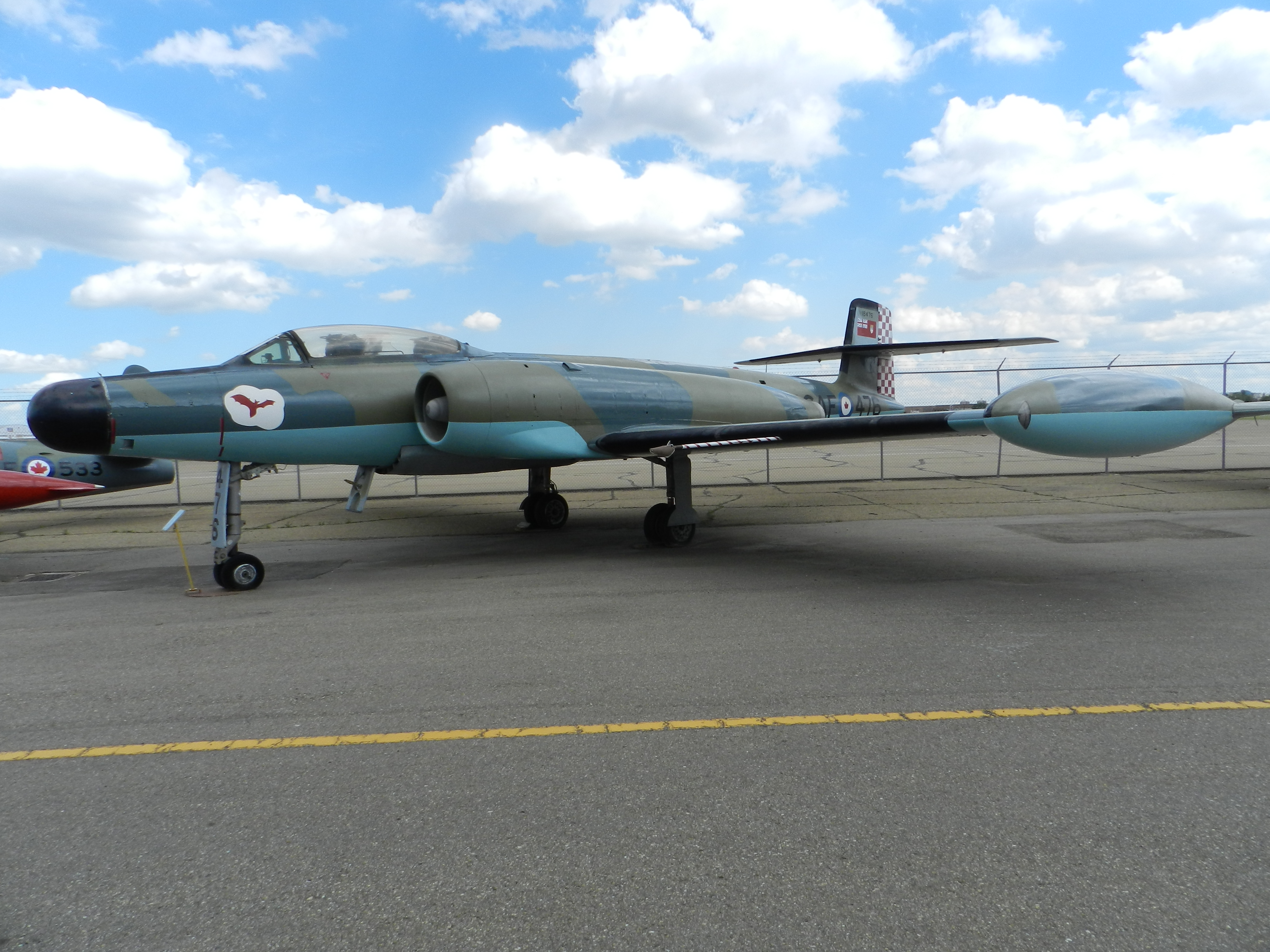

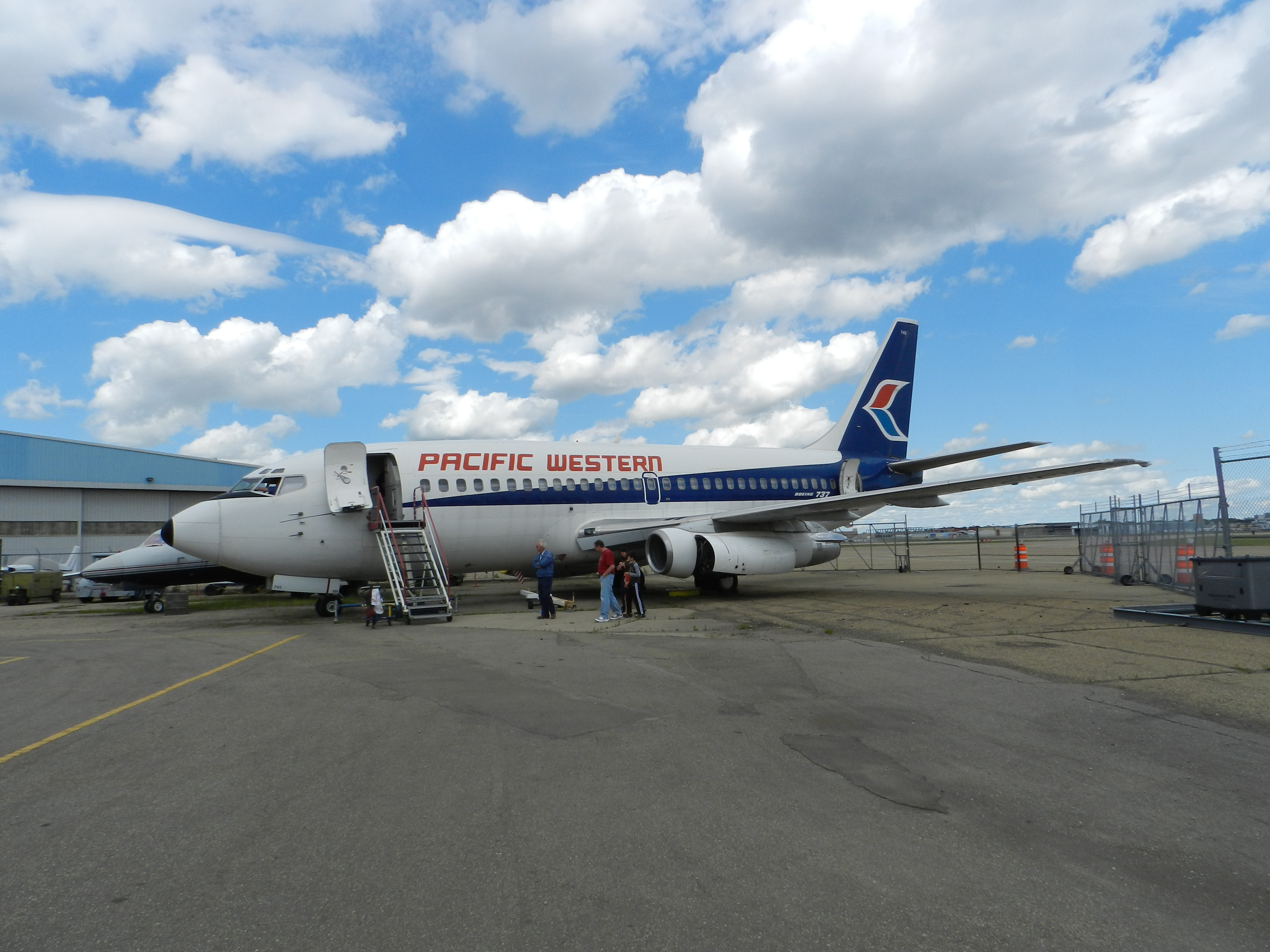

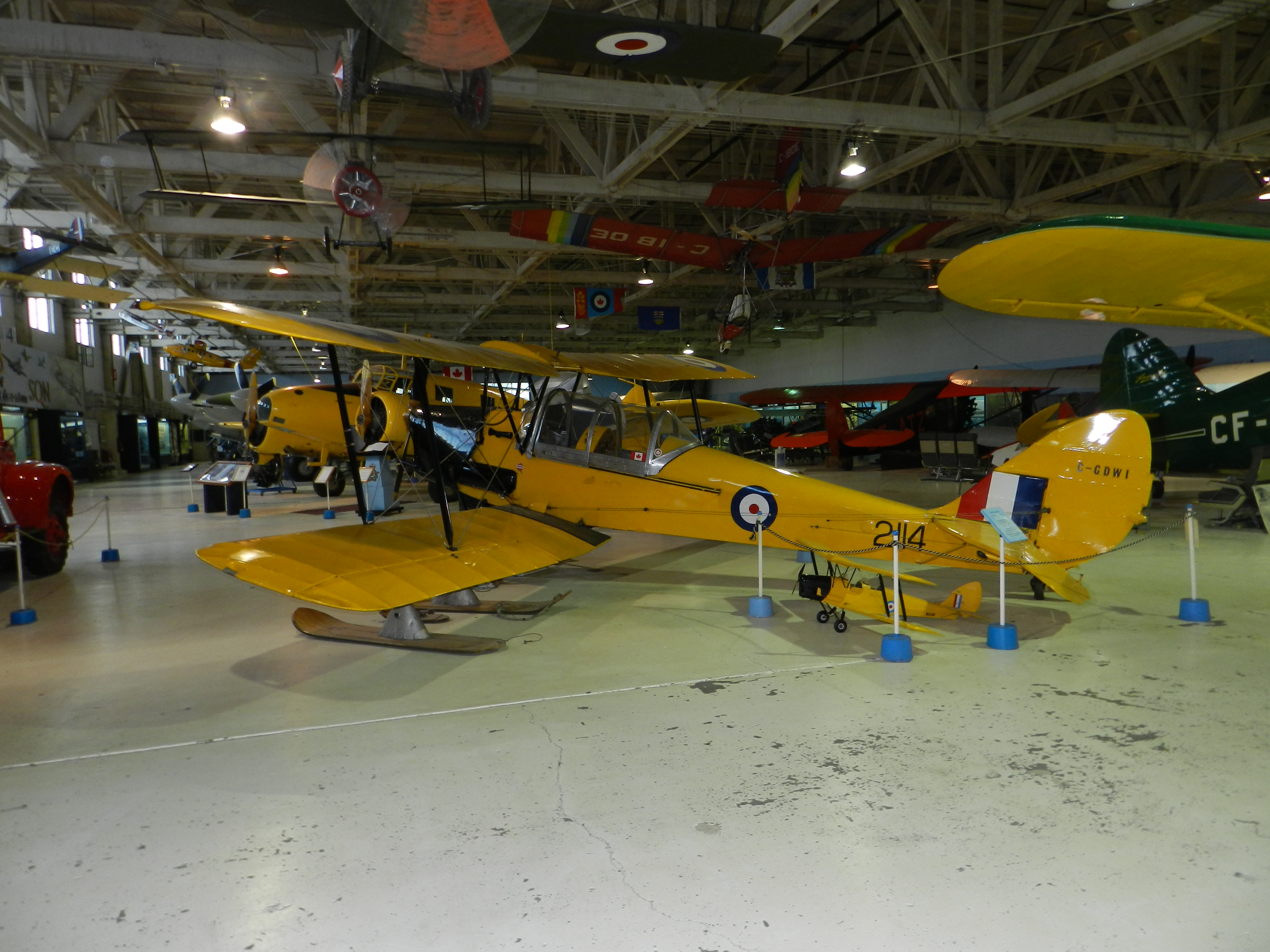

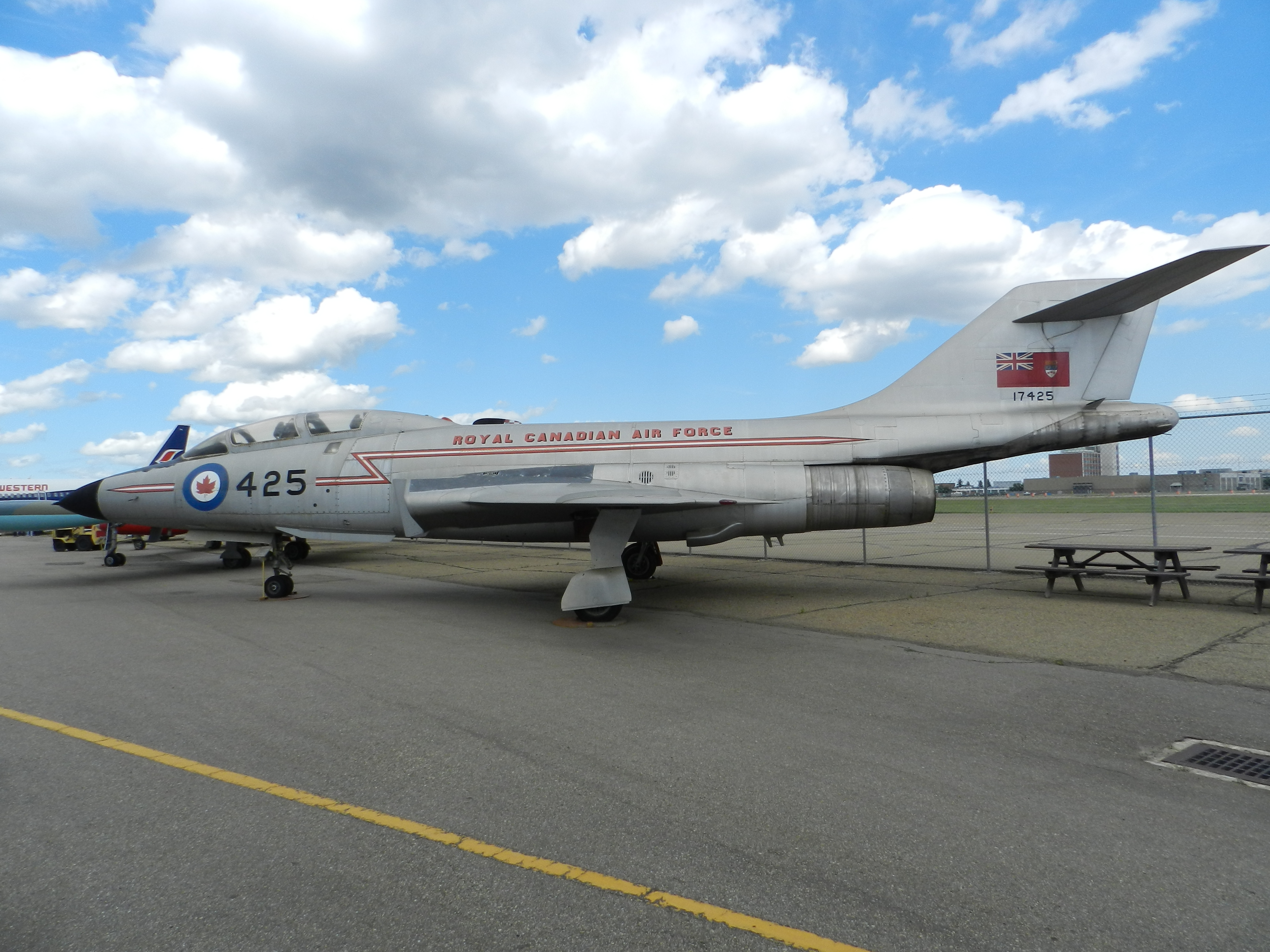

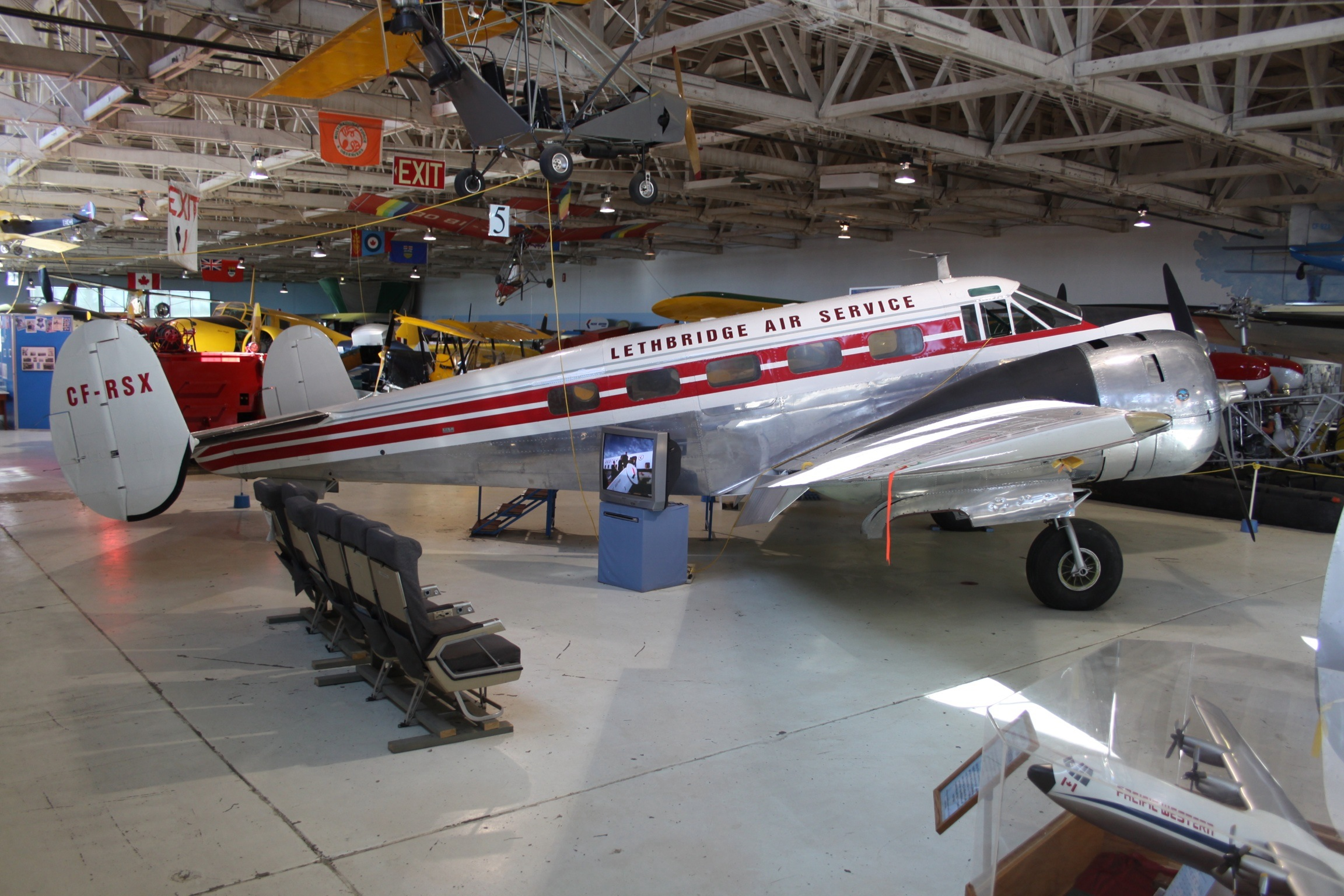

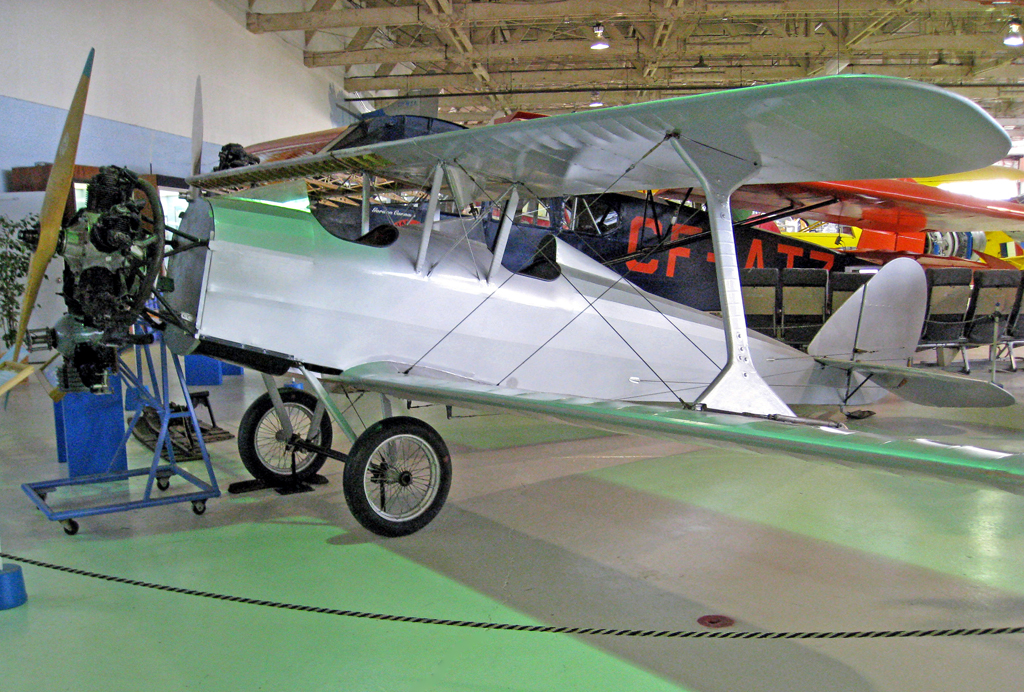

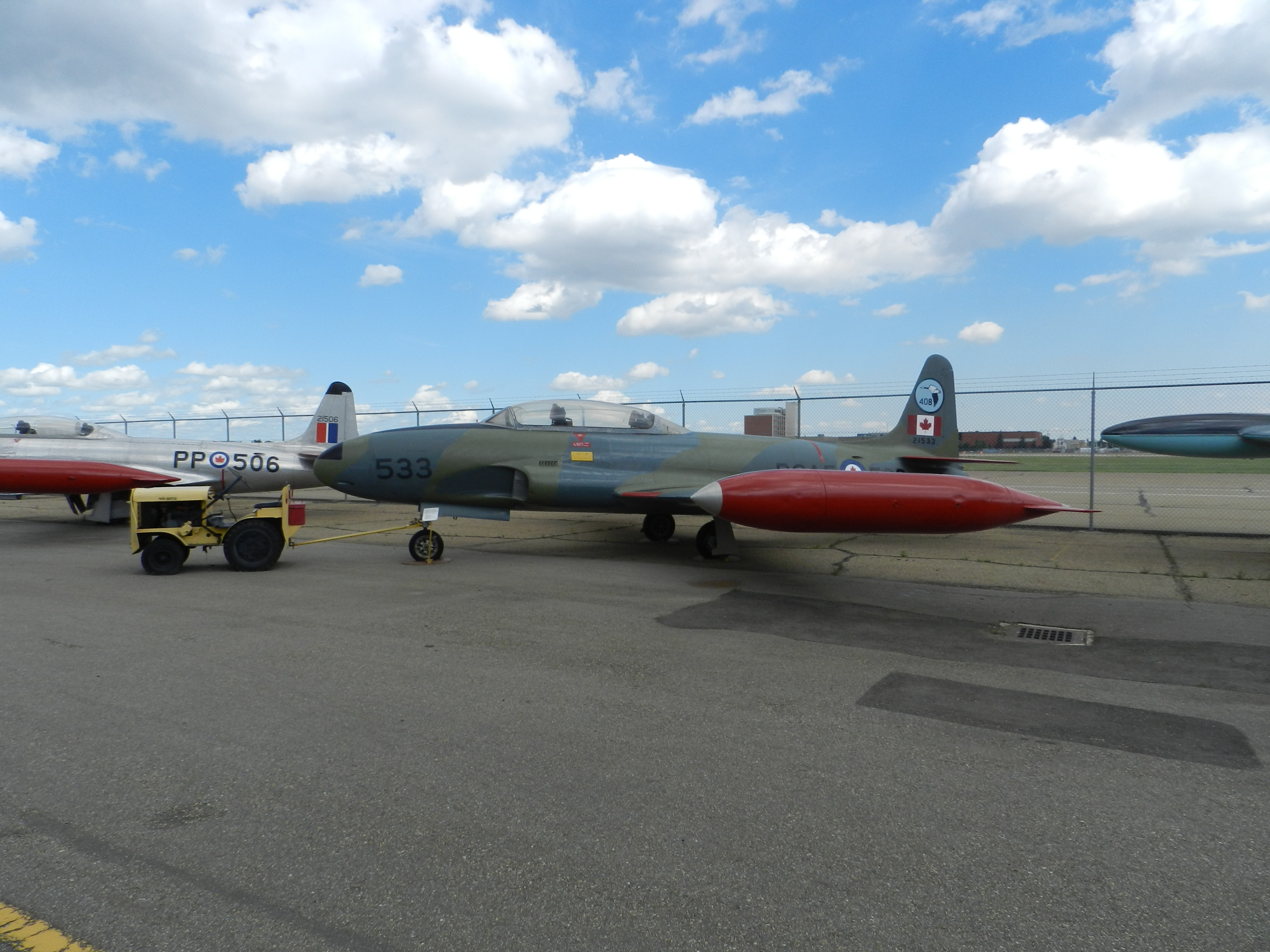

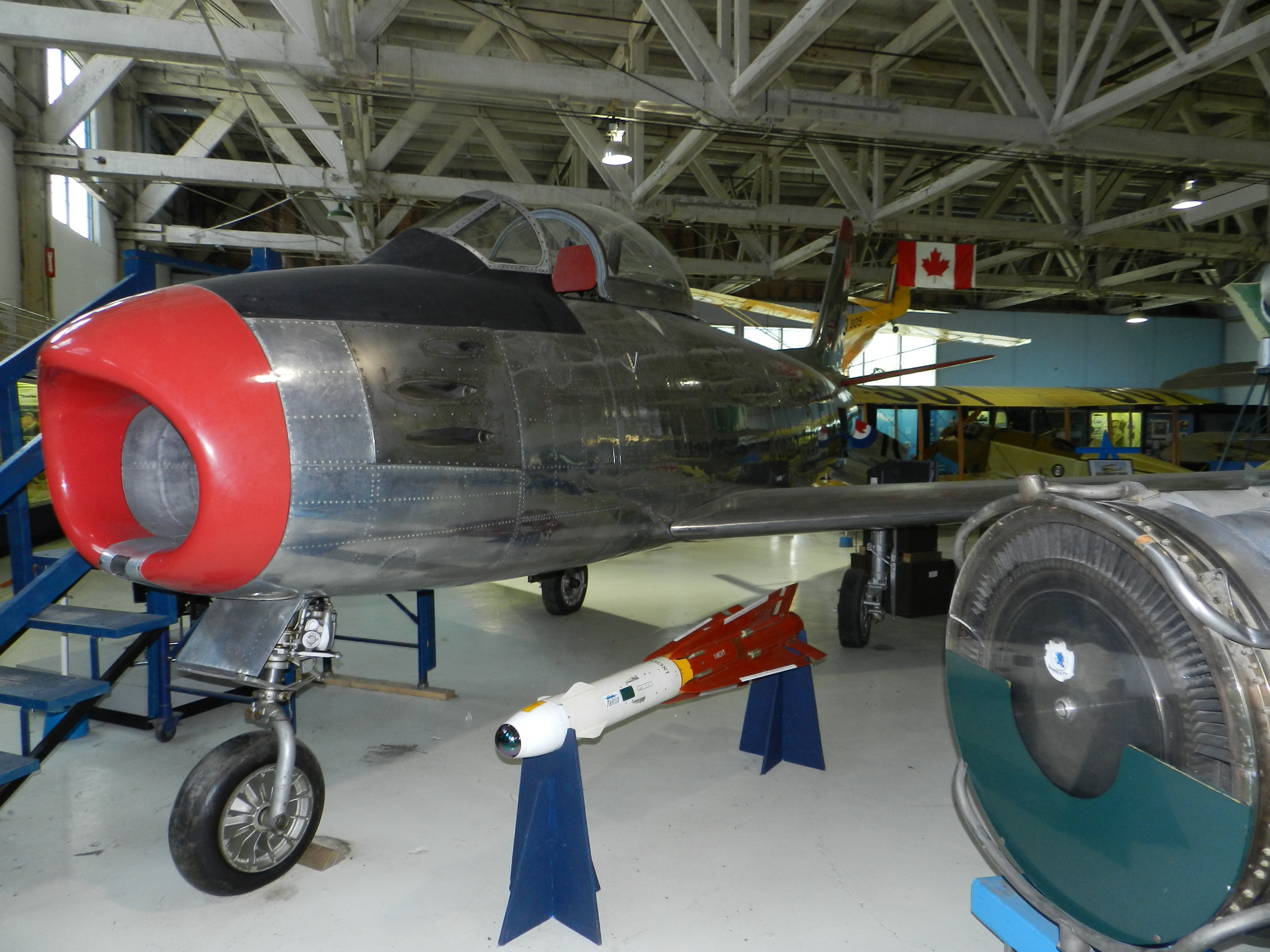

== Affiliations ==
The museum is affiliated with:Alberta Museums Association, Canadian Aeronautical Preservation Association, Canadian Museums Association, Canadian Heritage Information Network, Edmonton Heritage Council and Virtual Museum of Canada.
