= Noorduyn =

Aerospace manufacturer in Canada

- Industry: Aeronautics
- Predecessor: Noorduyn Aircraft Limited
- Founded: 1933; 93 years ago in Montreal, Canada
- Founder: Robert B. C. Noorduyn; Walter Clayton
- Headquarters: Montreal, Canada
- Products: Harvard trainer aircraft
- Owner: Norco Associates

Noorduyn is a Canadian manufacturer of aircraft products and accessories, specializing in high performance composites. It is headquartered in Montreal, and has offices worldwide serving the commercial, business and military aviation markets.

The company was originally established as Noorduyn Aircraft Limited, an aircraft manufacturer, by Dutch immigrant Robert B. C. Noorduyn and Walter Clayton. It was established in Montreal in 1933 and in early 1934, acquired the Curtiss-Reid factory in Cartierville, Quebec, near Montreal. In 1935, it began operating as Noorduyn Aviation. The rights to Noorduyn were traded on several occasions, and production ceased in 1959.

== Products ==
The first aircraft built was the Noorduyn Norseman I in 1934 with its first flight in 1935.

Five versions (II c. 1936, III c. 1937, IV c. 1937, V and VI) followed until early 1946, when the company was acquired by the Canadian Car & Foundry (CCF) company.

During World War II, Noorduyn began producing North American Harvard trainers for the Royal Canadian Air Force, production of which continued under CCF after the takeover.

== Noorduyn Norseman Aircraft Limited ==
In May 1953, CCF sold the rights to the Norseman to Noorduyn Norseman Aircraft Ltd., a company formed and led by Noorduyn, which was sold to Norco Associates in 1982. Norco does not build new aircraft but only provides support.

Noorduyn currently specializes in aircraft interior storage systems for commercial aircraft (galley carts, carriers, drawers, oven inserts, bins, bassinets, etc.) and slings and containers for military transport use.
