= Noorduyn Norseman =

1935 utility aircraft family by Noorduyn

Norseman
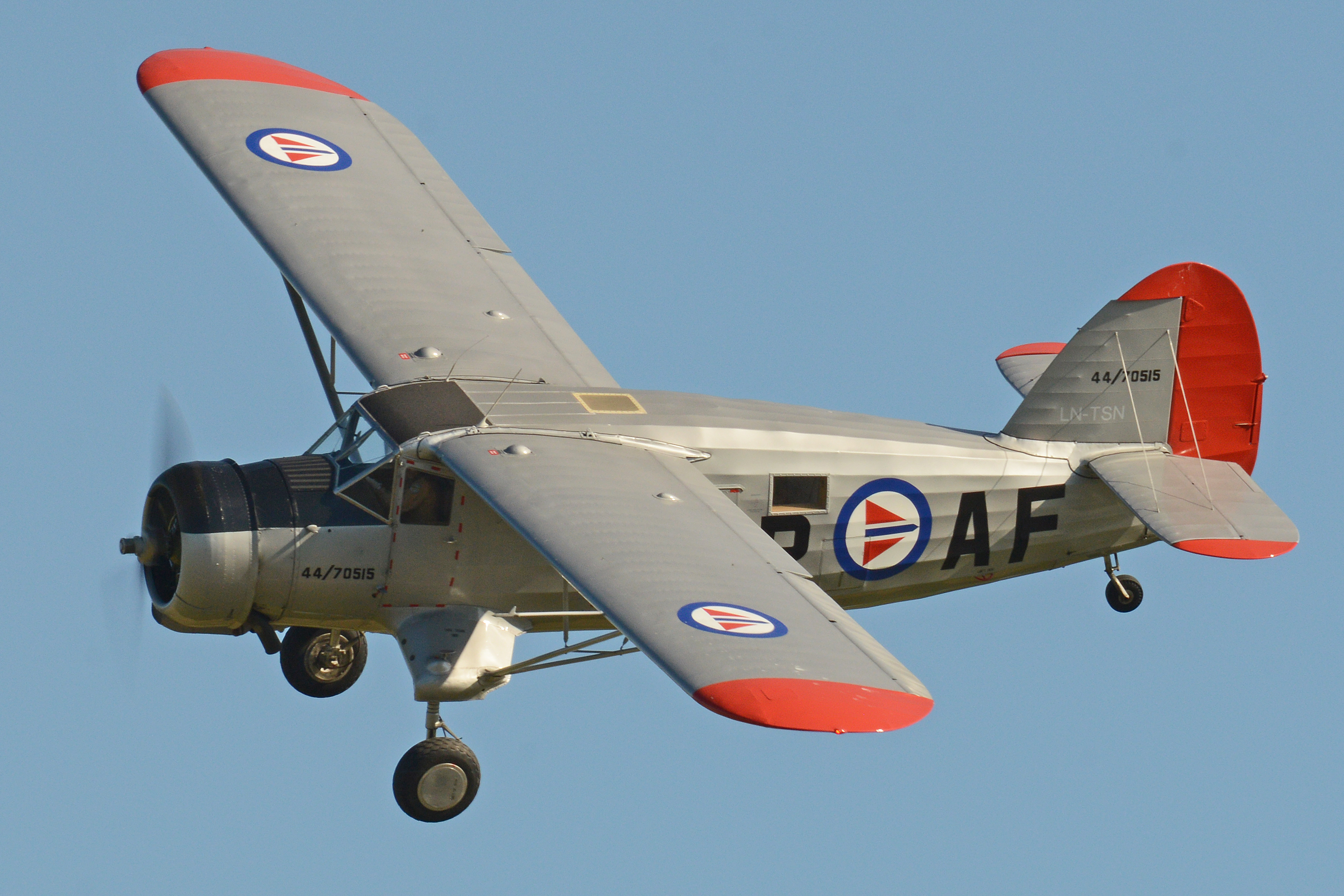
- A restored Norseman VI from the Norwegian Spitfire Foundation

General information
- Type: General aviation aircraft
- Manufacturer: Noorduyn Aircraft Ltd
- Designer: Robert B. C. Noorduyn
- Status: operational
- Primary users: USAAF RCAF and bush plane operators
- Number built: 904, including prototypes

History
- Manufactured: 1935–1959
- First flight: November 14, 1935

The Noorduyn Norseman, also known as the C-64 Norseman, is a Canadian single-engine bush plane designed to operate from unimproved surfaces. Distinctive stubby landing gear protrusions from the lower fuselage make it easily recognizable.

Introduced in 1935, the Norseman remained in production for almost 25 years with over 900 produced. A number of examples remain in commercial and private use. Norseman aircraft are known to have been registered or operated in 68 countries and have been based and flown in the Arctic and Antarctic regions.

== Design and development ==
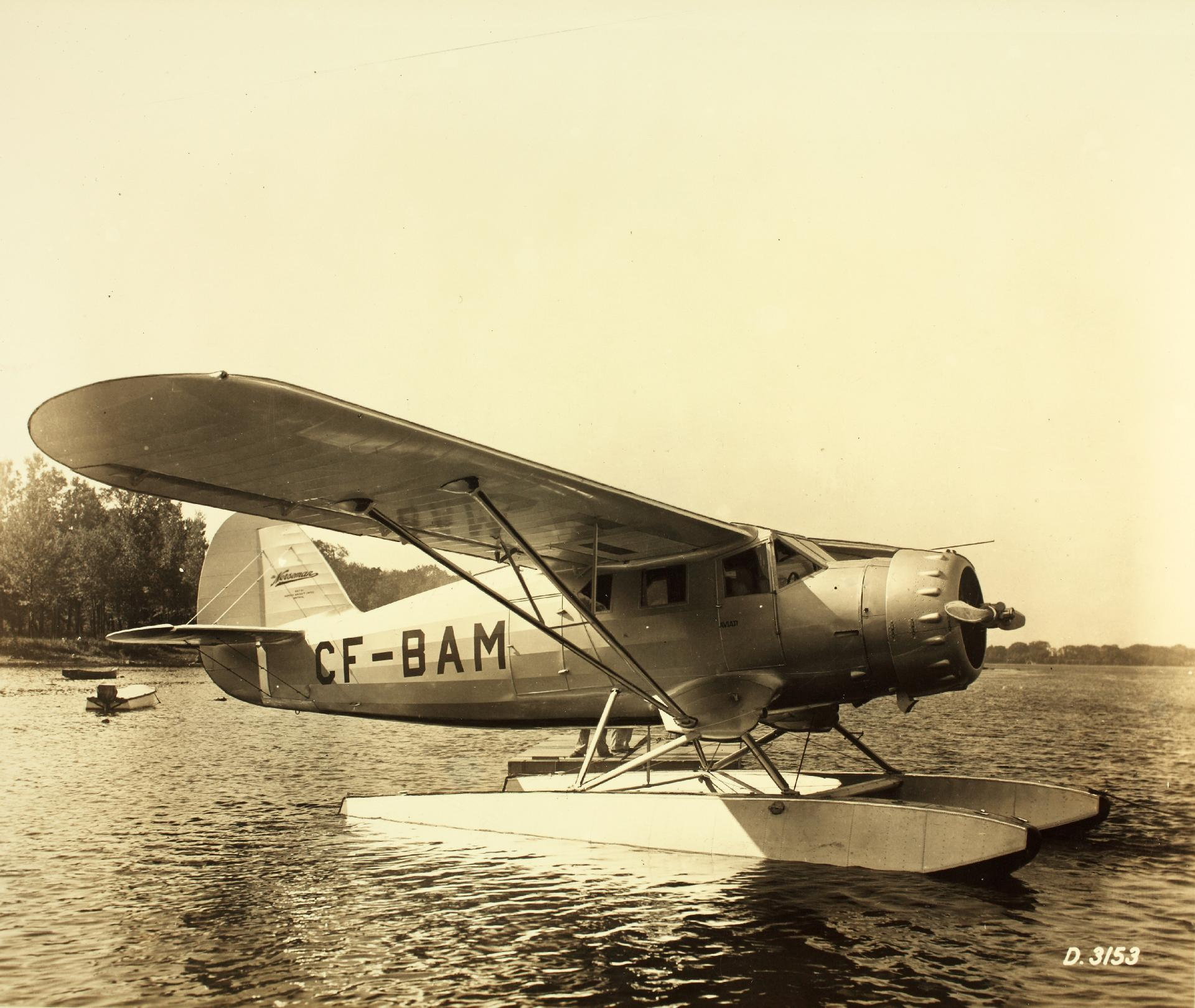
Noorduyn Norseman CF-BAM as a Mk.IV, after conversion from Mk.III in 1937

Designed by Robert B. C. Noorduyn, the Noorduyn Norseman was produced from 1935 to 1959, originally by Noorduyn Aircraft Ltd. and later by the Canadian Car and Foundry company.

With the experience of working at Fokker, Bellanca and Pitcairn-Cierva, Noorduyn decided to create his own design in 1934. Along with his colleague, Walter Clayton, Noorduyn created his original company, Noorduyn Aircraft Limited, in early 1933 at Montreal, which then was reorganized in 1935, as Noorduyn Aviation.

Noorduyn's ideal bush plane was a high-wing monoplane airframe to facilitate loading and unloading passengers and cargo at seaplane docks, where the high wing provided the best clearance from docks and seaplane ramp fencing, and least opportunity for damage, and from conventional airports, with a structure that could be easily repaired in the bush. Noorduyn designed it to have interchangeable wheel, ski or twin-float landing gear. Unlike most aircraft designs, the Norseman was first fitted with floats, then skis and, finally, wheels.

The final design looked much like Noorduyn's earlier Bellanca Skyrocket, a strut-braced high-wing monoplane with a welded steel tubing fuselage. Attached wood stringers carried a fabric covering that faired out the more refined shape. Its wing had a wood structure covered in fabric, except for steel tubing in the flaps and ailerons. The divided landing gear were fitted to fuselage stubs with the legs secured with two bolts each to allow the alternate arrangement of floats or skis. The tail could be fitted with a wheel or skid.

== Operational history ==
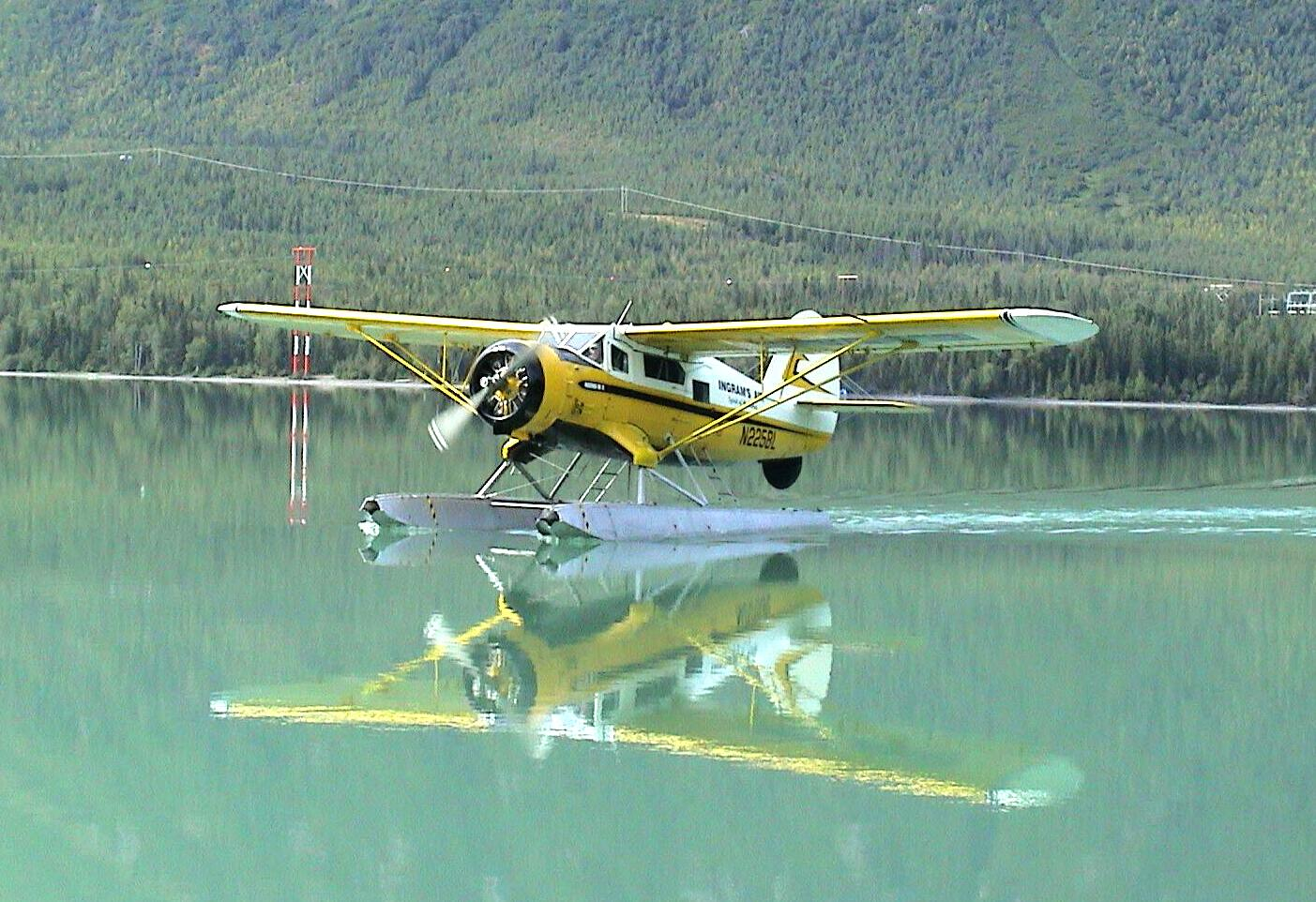
"Spirit of the Kenai", landing on Kenai Lake, in Alaska, August 2003

The first Norseman, powered by a Wright R-975-E3 Whirlwind, was flight tested on floats on November 14, 1935, and was sold and delivered to Dominion Skyways Ltd. on January 18, 1936, registered as "CF-AYO" and named “Arcturus." In summer 1941, Warner Brothers leased CF-AYO for the filming of "Captains of the Clouds" starring James Cagney. Principal aerial photography took place near North Bay, Ontario with CF-AYO carrying temporary registration "CF-HGO." CF-AYO was lost in a crash in Algonquin Park in 1952. Its wreckage currently is on display at the Canadian Bushplane Heritage Centre.

Almost immediately, the Norseman proved itself to be a rugged, reliable workhorse with steady sales for the era. The prototype, serial number 1, CF-AYO, was designated the Norseman Mk.I.

The next four aircraft (serial numbers 2, 3, 4 and 5) were Norseman Mk.IIIs. CF-AZA went to MacKenzie Air Service, Edmonton, Alberta, CF-AZE to Prospector Airways, Clarkson, Ontario, CF-AZS to Starrat Airways, Hudson, Ontario, and CF-BZM to Mackenzie Air Service, as CF-BAM. Several additional aircraft were to have been Mk.IIIs but were completed as Mk.IVs.

CF-BAU, serial number 6, had minor changes that were required for it to be certified, and had a customer supplied 450 hp (340 kW) Pratt & Whitney R-1340 Wasp SC-1 engine as the Norseman Mk.II, but was later re-engined with a 600 hp (450 kW) Pratt & Whitney Wasp S3H-1, its original intended engine, on June 26, 1937 as the prototype for the Norseman Mk.IV.

The Mk.IV was the definitive pre-war model but the production run might have ended at a few hundred examples if not for the advent of the Second World War.

=== Second World War ===
By 1940, Noorduyn had sold only 17 aircraft, primarily to commercial operators in Canada's north and to the Royal Canadian Mounted Police. With the outbreak of war, demand for a utility transport led to large military orders. The Royal Canadian Air Force and the United States Army Air Forces became the two largest operators. The RCAF ordered 38 Norseman Mk.IVWs for radio and navigational training for the British Commonwealth Air Training Plan.

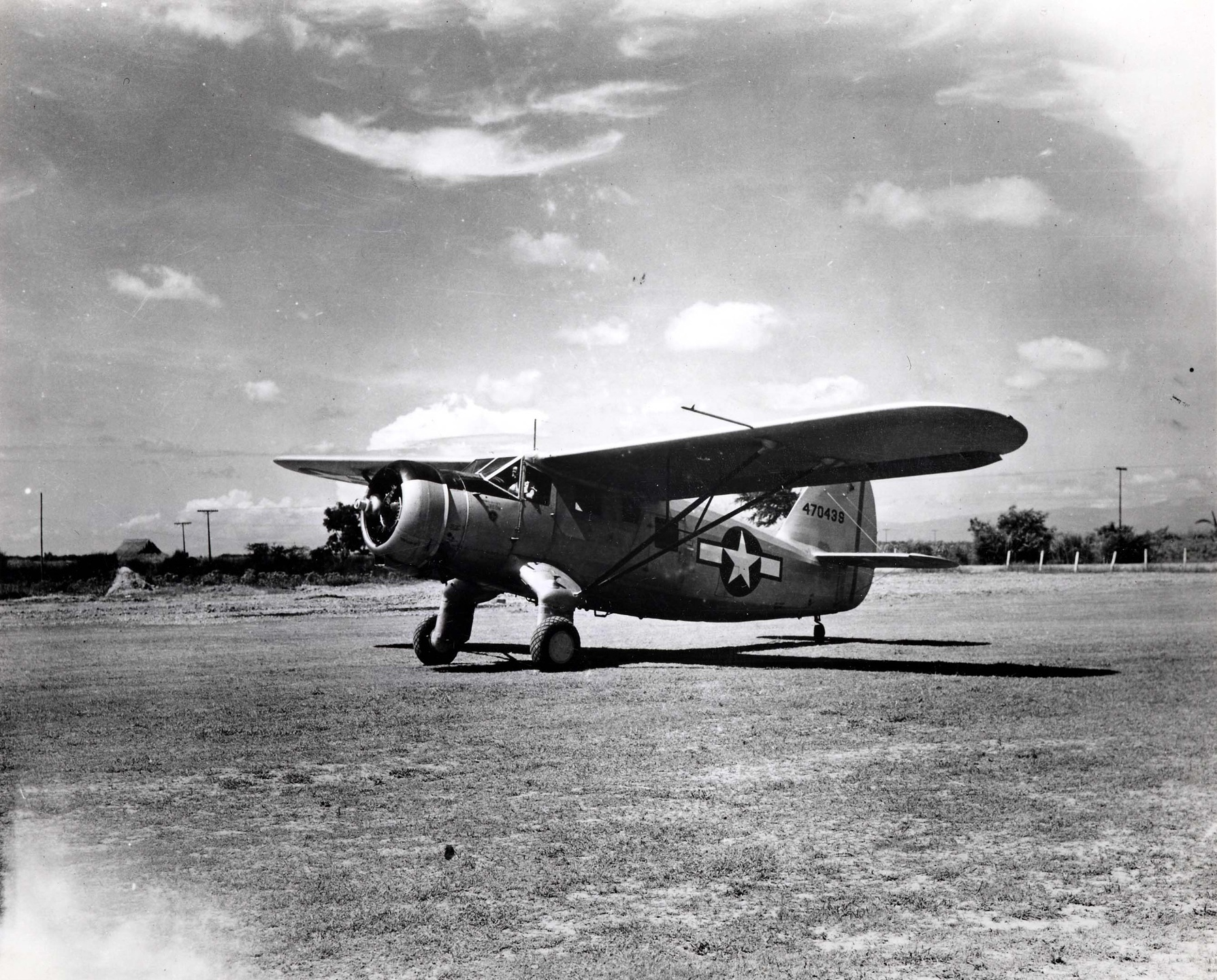
USAAF 3rd Air Commando Group UC-64A in the Philippines, 1945

USAAF Colonel Bernt Balchen was establishing a staging route across Greenland to ferry aircraft to Europe. He required a transport rugged enough to survive in the harsh conditions of the Arctic. After evaluating six Norsemans diverted from the RCAF order, late in 1941, he recommended the purchase of the Norseman Mk.IV specially modified to USAAF requirements as the YC-64A. After the US entry into the Second World War, the USAAF placed the first of several orders for a production version C-64A Norseman. The principal differences included two fuselage belly tanks raising the standard fuel capacity to 201 imp gal (910 L; 241 US gal), and an additional cabin fuel tank of 32 imp gal (150 L; 38 US gal) that could also be installed. These changes resulted in an increase of 950 lb (430 kg) in the loaded weight. Deliveries began mid-1942, with the US military eventually ordered 749 Norseman Mk.IVs as the C-64A (later UC-64A).

Throughout the Second World War, the USAAF Norseman aircraft were used in North America (primarily Alaska) as well as other in theaters of war, including Europe. Three UC-64As were used by the US Navy under the designation JA-1. Six C-64B floatplanes were used by the US Army Corps of Engineers. Other Allied air forces also placed orders, for 43 Norseman Mk.IVs. The RCAF ordered an additional 34 aircraft as Norseman Mk.VIs. Noorduyn was still the sole manufacturer, but when the USAAF considered ordering a larger number of C-64As, license production of 600 by Aeronca Aircraft Corp. (Middletown, Ohio) was planned before being cancelled in 1943.

Major Glenn Miller was a passenger on a UC-64A Norseman (s/n 44-70285) flown by F/O John R. S. Morgan which disappeared over the English Channel on December 15, 1944.

Another Norseman crashed into King Alfred's Tower, a 50 m (160 ft) tall Stourhead estate folly in Somerset, England, killing all five air crew in 1944.

=== Postwar ===
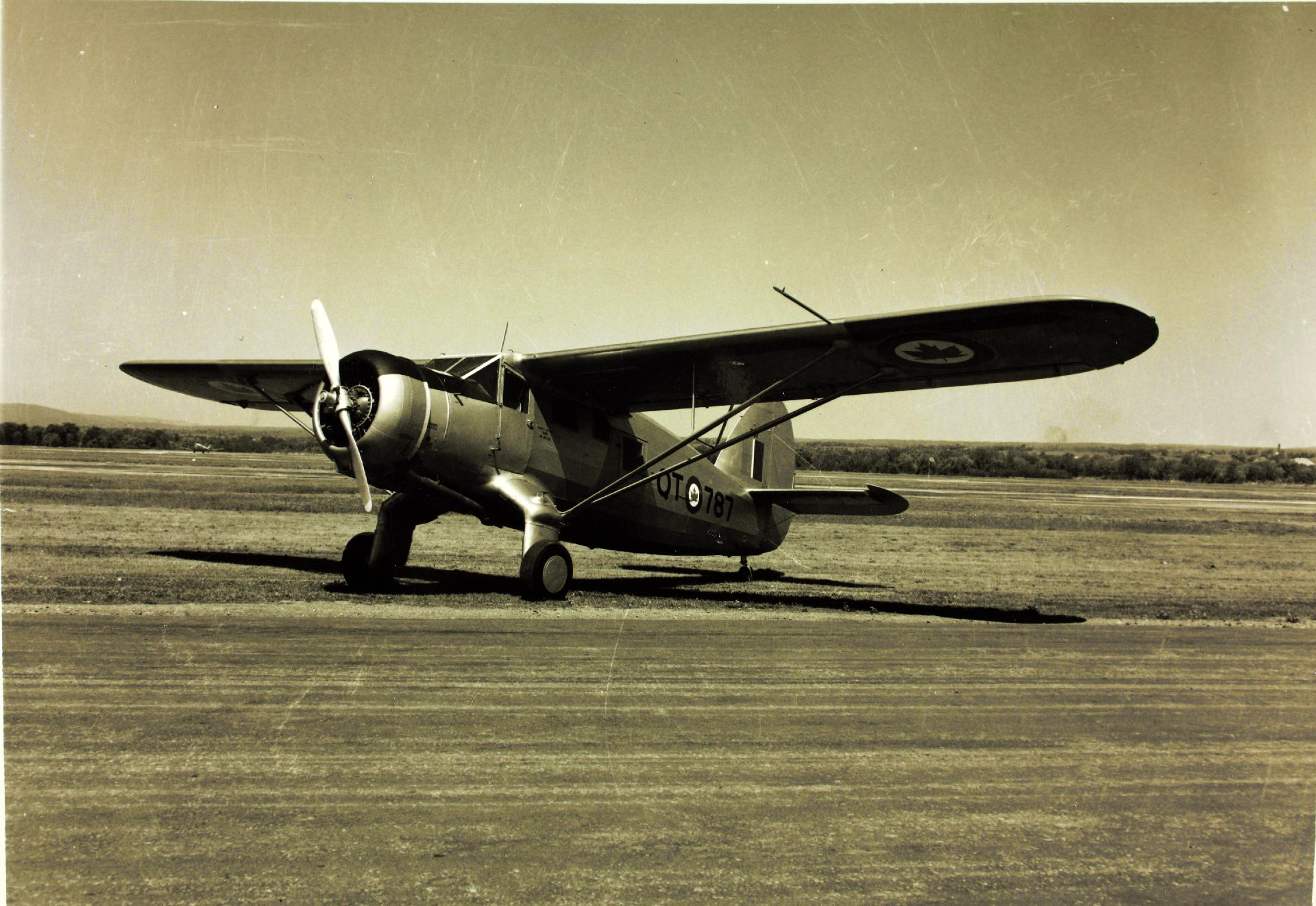
413 (P) Squadron RCAF Noorduyn Norseman Mk.VI QT 787, based at RCAF Station Rockcliffe

Postwar, the Canada Car and Foundry acquired the rights to the design and produced the Norseman Mk.V, a civilian version of the UC-64. To further improve the basic design, "Can Car" designed and built the Norseman Mk.VII with a bigger engine, a new all-metal wing and greater cargo capacity but it never went into production. With large Korean War commitments at that time, the company put it into temporary storage where it was destroyed in a hangar fire in September 1951.

In 1953, Noorduyn headed a group of investors who bought back the jigs and equipment from Canada Car and Foundry and started a new company called Noorduyn Norseman Aircraft Ltd. Bob Noorduyn became ill and died at his home in South Burlington, Vermont, on 22 February 1959. The company continued to provide support for operating Norseman aircraft and built three new Mk.Vs before selling its assets in 1982 to Norco Associates. Norco provided support services only, as Norseman aircraft manufacture wasn't seen as being likely to be profitable.

The last Noorduyn Norseman built was sold to a commercial customer on January 19, 1959. 903 Norseman Mk.I to Mk.V were produced and delivered to commercial and military customers. There are currently 42 Norseman aircraft on the active Canadian aircraft registry and 9 active in the United States. The number in use worldwide is not known.

In recognition of the Norseman's role in serving northern Canada, the town of Red Lake, Ontario, a jumping-off point for remote communities in Northwestern Ontario, promotes itself as The Norseman Capital of the World. Each summer in July, the "Norseman Floatplane Festival" brings Norseman aircraft to Red Lake as the centrepiece of a community based weekend festival ranging from stage entertainment, children's games and rides, contests, cultural and historical displays and street vendors with craft and specialty booths.

Canadian Second World War ace George Beurling died in May 1948 landing a Norseman at Urbe Airport in Italy while ferrying it to the newly formed Israeli Air Force. The engine of a Norseman that crashed during Operation Maccabi of the 1948 Arab-Israeli War are on the IAF's Har Hatayasim (Pilots' Mountain) memorial near Jerusalem.

== Operators ==
=== Major civil operators ===
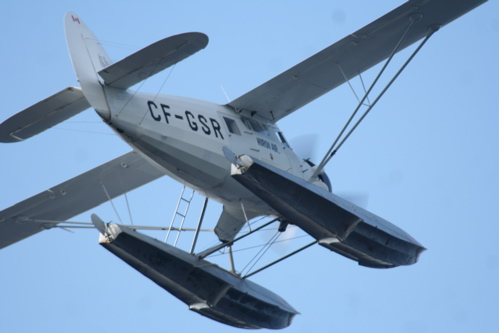
Huron Air Noorduyn Norseman CF-GSR at Red Lake, Ontario, 2007

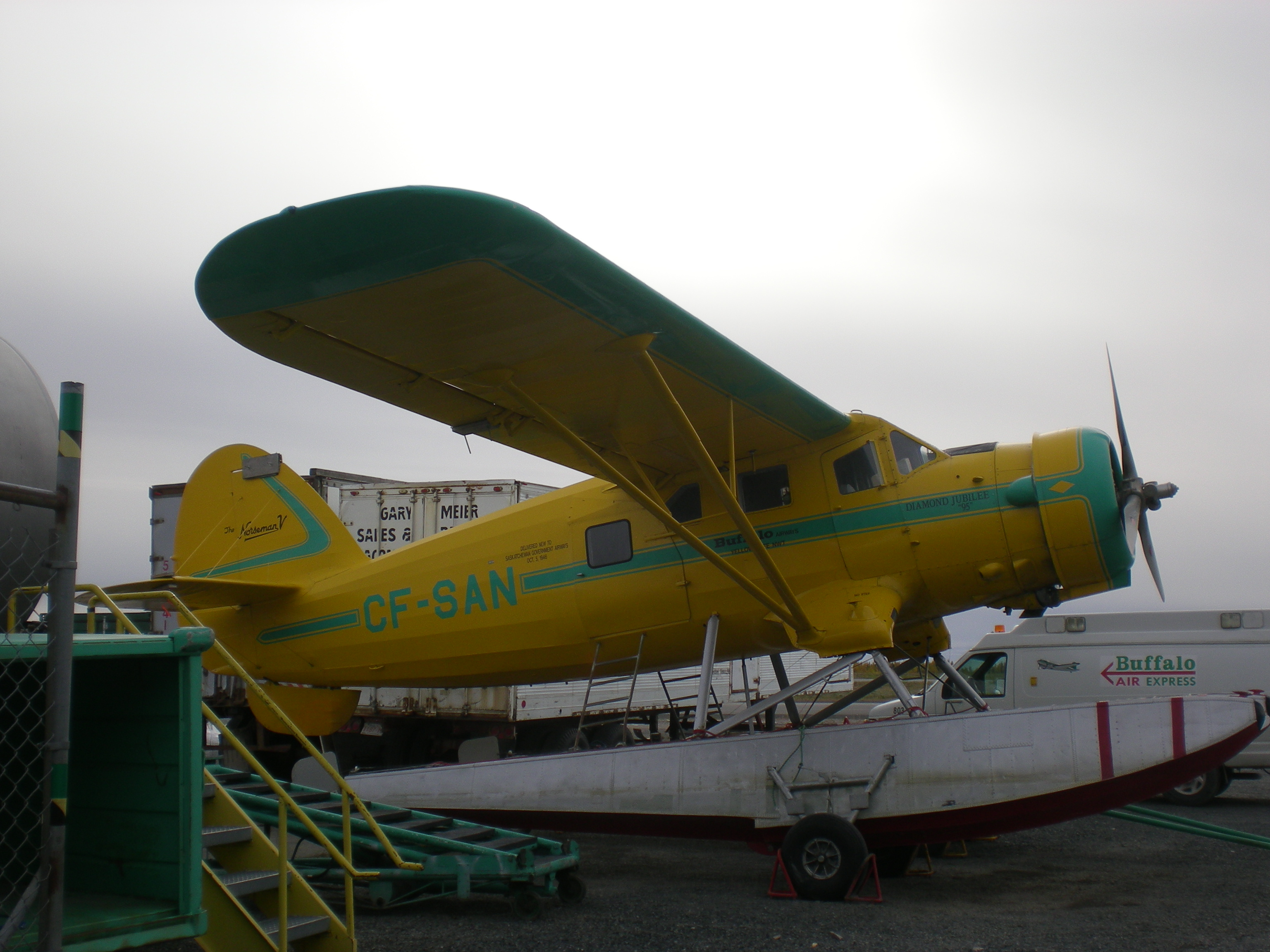
Buffalo Airways Norseman on floats in Yellowknife, NWT

Argentina

- Aviación del Litoral Fluvial Argentino

Canada

- Austin Airways (retired)
- Bearskin Airlines (retired)
- Buffalo Airways (retired)
- Canadian Airways & Western Canada Airways (retired)
- Canadian Pacific Airlines (retired)
- Central Northern Airways (retired)
- Imperial Oil (retired)
- Lamb Air
- Ontario Central Airlines (retired)
- Ontario Provincial Air Service - 4 (1943 to 1947) eventually sold 1951 to 1952
- Pacific Western Airlines
- Royal Canadian Mounted Police
- Saskatchewan Air Ambulance
- Saskatchewan Government Airways
- Starratt Airways

Norway

- Fjellfly
- Norving
- Widerøes Flyveselskap

Philippines

- Far Eastern Air Transport Inc. (FEATI) (1946-1947)
- Philippine Airlines (transferred from FEATI, from 1947-1955)

=== Military operators ===
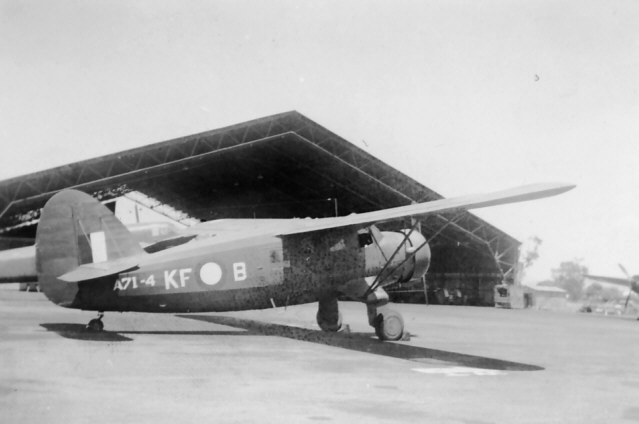
Lend-Lease RAAF Noorduyn Norseman Mk.VI A71-4 with 5 CU

Australia

- Royal Australian Air Force operated 14 aircraft from 1943 to 1946.
  - No. 1 Communications Unit RAAF
  - No. 3 Communications Unit RAAF
  - No. 4 Communications Unit RAAF
  - No. 5 Communications Unit RAAF
  - No. 7 Communications Unit RAAF

Brazil

- Brazilian Air Force operated 19 aircraft from 1944 to 1960

Canada

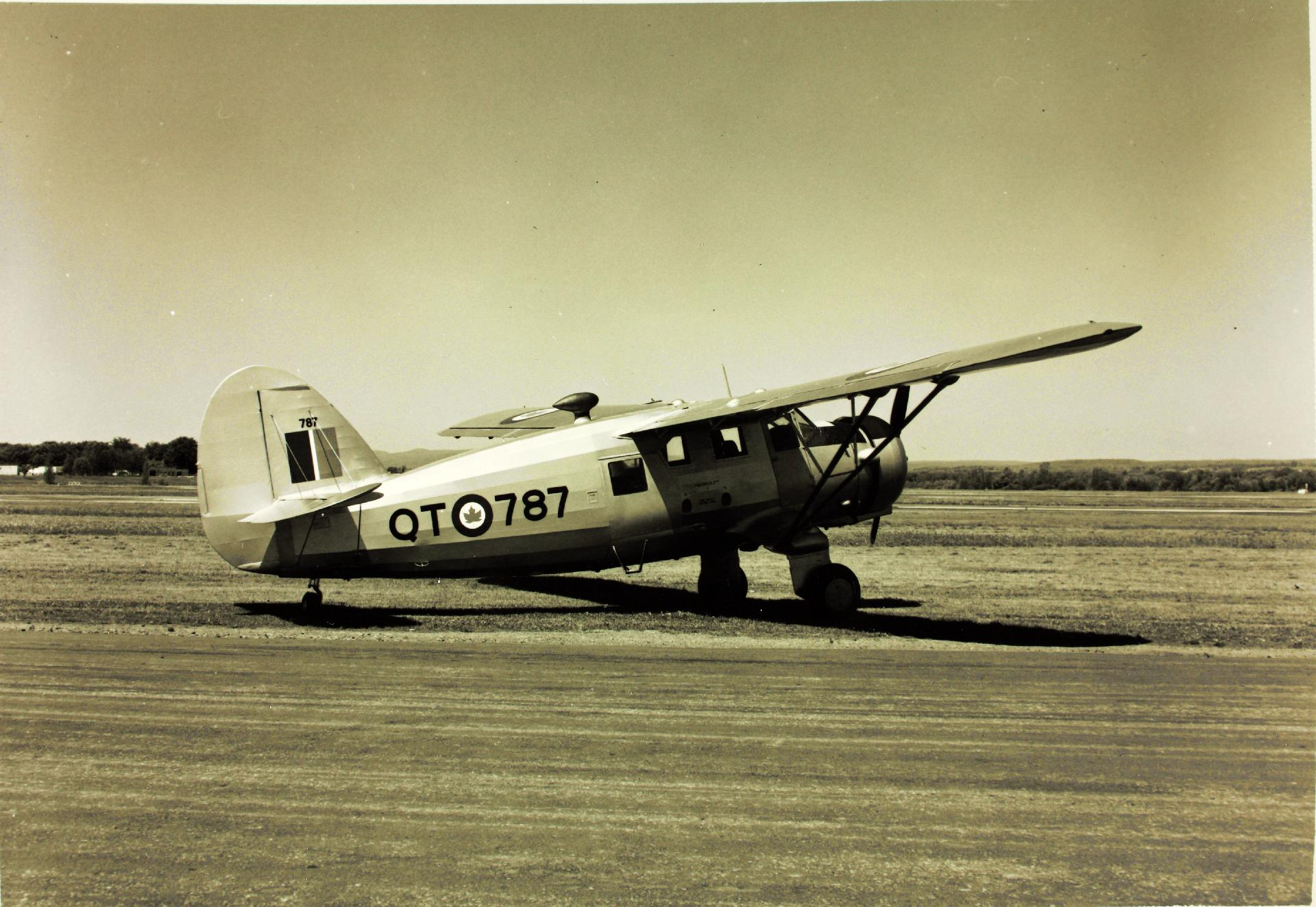
RCAF 413 (P) Squadron Noorduyn Norseman Mk.VI QT 787, based at RCAF Station Rockcliffe, Ontario

- Royal Canadian Air Force operated 79 aircraft from 1940 to 1953
  - 103 Search and Rescue Squadron
- Royal Canadian Navy operated 21 aircraft from 1943 to 1957

Costa Rica

- Air Surveillance Service operated one aircraft in 1948

Cuba

- Cuban Air Force received one aircraft in 1951

Czechoslovakia

- Czechoslovak Air Force operated Norseman postwar under designation K-73.

Egypt

- Egyptian Air Force operated two aircraft from 1948 to 1960

Honduras

- Honduran Air Force operated two aircraft from 1945 to 1961

Indonesia

- Indonesian Air Force received one aircraft in 1950

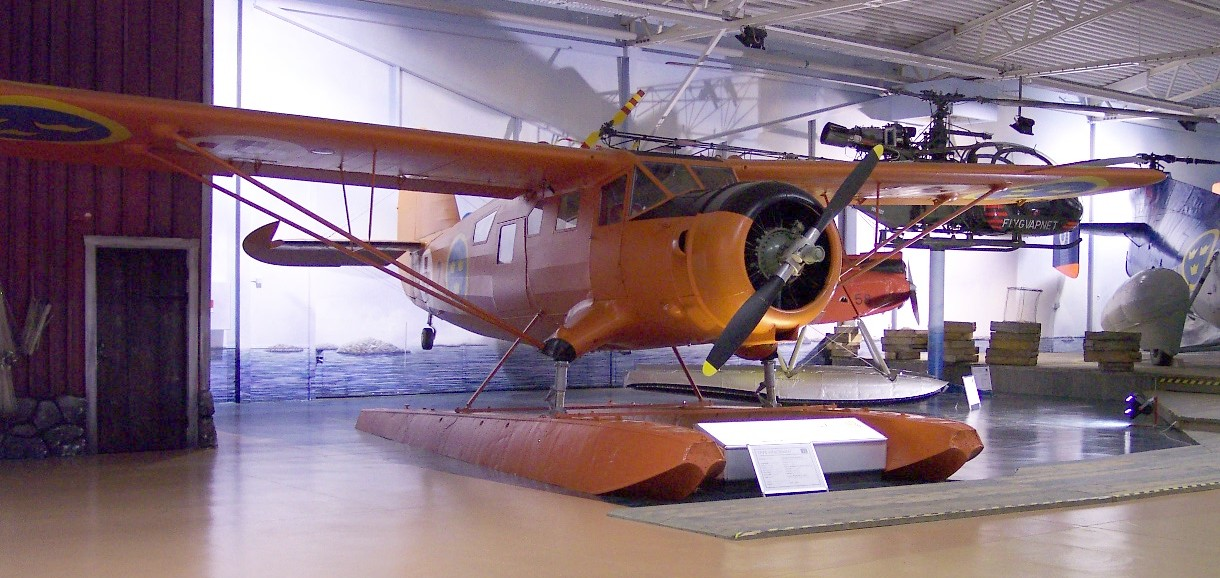
Noorduyn Tp 78 in original colours at Flygvapenmuseum.

Israel

- Israeli Air Force operated 17 aircraft from 1948 to 1954

Netherlands

- Royal Netherlands East Indies Army Air Force operated one aircraft from 1948 to 1950

Norway

- Royal Norwegian Air Force operated 22 aircraft from 1945 to 1959

Philippines

- Philippine Air Force operated two aircraft from 1946 to 1952

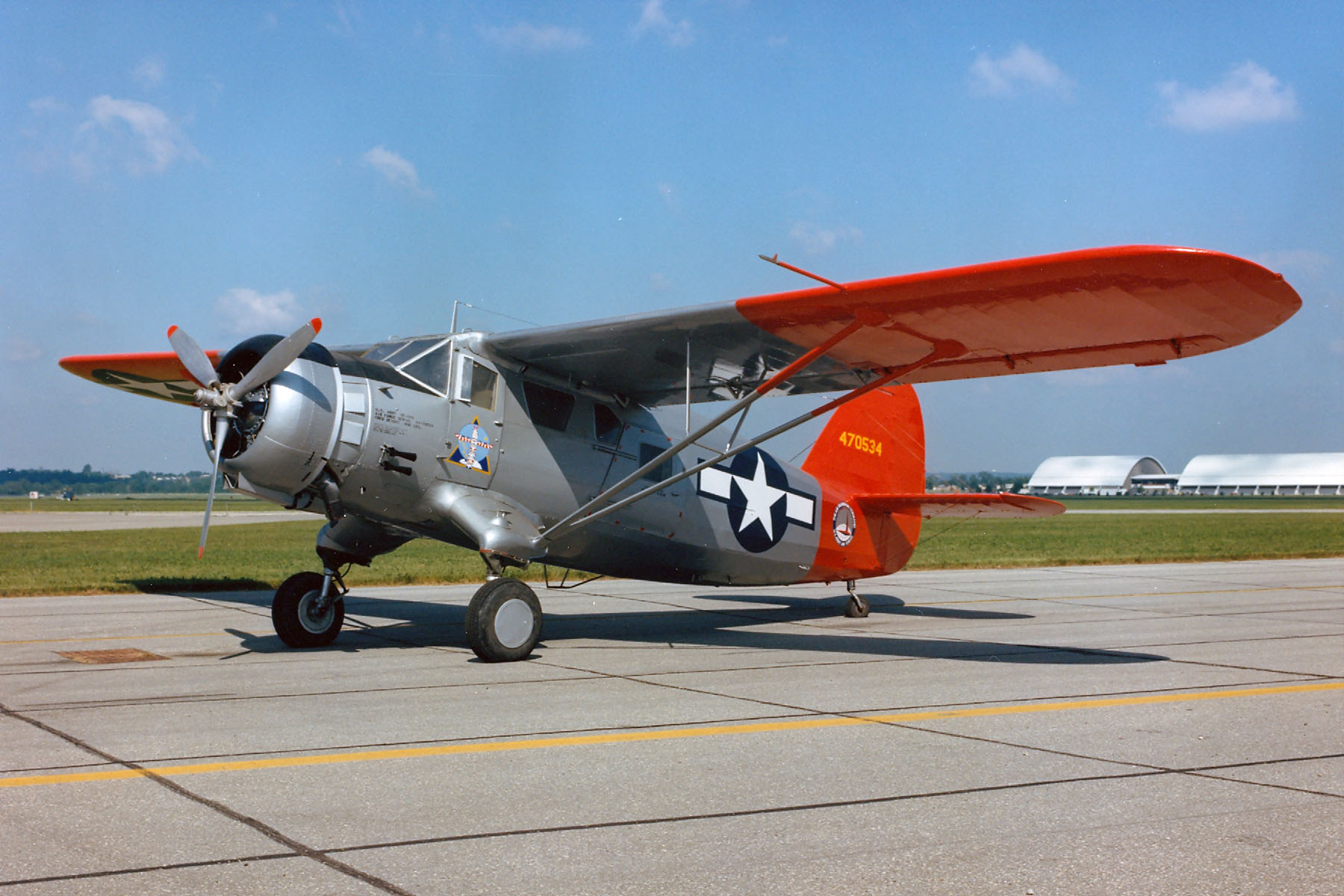
USAAF Noorduyn UC-64 at the USAF Museum.

Sweden

- Swedish Air Force operated three as the Tp 78 from 1949 to 1959 as air-rescue/ambulance transports. One crashed in 1954, a second burnt at F 4 in 1956. In 1980, the survivor was repurchased by Swedish Air Force Museum and restored in 1989.

United Kingdom

- Royal Air Force

United States

- United States Army Air Corps
- United States Army Air Forces
- United States Air Force
- United States Navy purchased three Norsemans in 1945 (under designation JA-1) to support Antarctic expeditions like Operation Highjump.

== Specifications (Norseman Mark V) ==
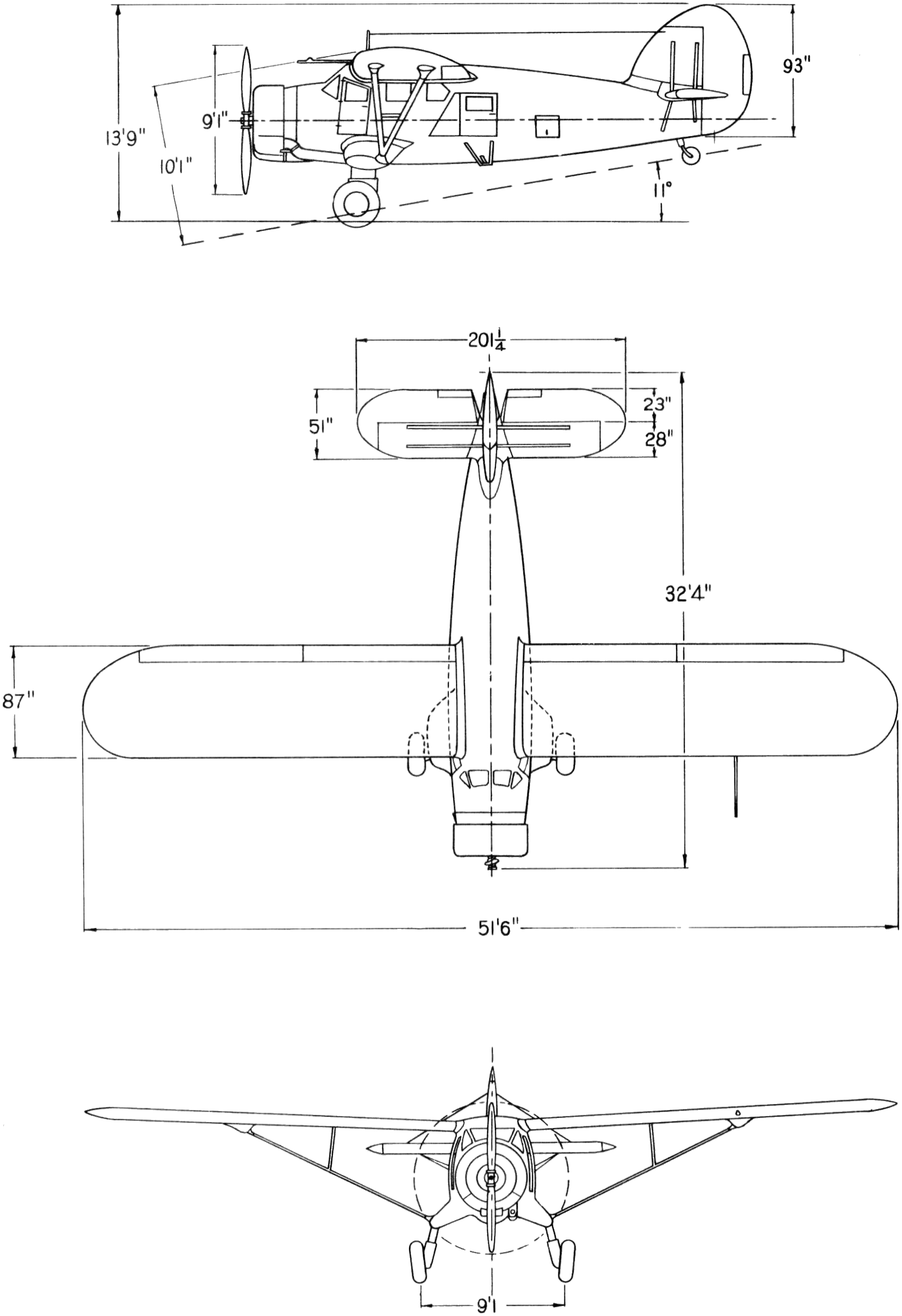
3-view line drawing of Noorduyn C-64A Norseman

Data from Jane's all the World's Aircraft 1947.

General characteristics

- Crew: 1
- Capacity: 10
- Length: 32 ft 4 in (9.86 m)
- Wingspan: 51 ft 6 in (15.70 m)
- Height: 10 ft 1 in (3.07 m)
- Wing area: 325 sq ft (30.2 m^{2})
- Airfoil: NACA 2412
- Empty weight: 4,240 lb (1,923 kg)
- Max takeoff weight: 7,400 lb (3,357 kg) ;7,540 lb (3,420 kg) with floats
- Fuel capacity: 100 imp gal (450 L; 120 US gal) in 2 wing roots + optional 37.4 imp gal (170 L; 44.9 US gal) or 2 x 101.6 imp gal (462 L; 122.0 US gal) auxiliary cabin tanks
- Powerplant: 1 × Pratt & Whitney R-1340-AN1 9 cyl.air cooled radial piston engine, 600 hp (450 kW)
- Propellers: 3-bladed Hamilton Standard, 9 ft 0.75 in (2.7623 m) diameter constant-speed propeller

Performance

- Maximum speed: 155 mph (249 km/h, 135 kn) landplane; 138 mph (120 kn; 222 km/h) (skis); 134 mph (116 kn; 216 km/h) (floats)
- Cruise speed: 130 mph (210 km/h, 110 kn) KTAS at 10,000 ft (3,000 m)
- Stall speed: 68 mph (109 km/h, 59 kn)
- Range: 932 mi (1,500 km, 810 nmi) at 10,000 ft (3,000 m)
- Service ceiling: 17,000 ft (5,200 m)
- Time to altitude:

7 minutes to 5,000 ft (1,500 m) (landplane)
9 minutes to 5,000 ft (1,500 m) (floatplane)

- Wing loading: 22.8 lb/sq ft (111 kg/m^{2})
- Power/mass: 0.08 hp/lb (0.13 kW/kg)
- Maximum - Flaps extended (V_{fe}): 108 miles per hour (94 kn; 174 km/h)

== See also ==
- Noorduyn Norseman in popular culture

Aircraft of comparable role, configuration, and era

- Bellanca Senior Skyrocket & Senior Pacemaker
- de Havilland Canada DHC-3 Otter
- Fairchild 82
- Fairchild F-11 Husky
- Howard DGA-8

Related lists

- List of aircraft of Canada's air forces
- List of Bushplanes
- List of aircraft of the United States during World War II
- List of United States Air Force aircraft designations (1919–1962)
