= First Nations Information Governance Centre =

Canadian non-profit for First Nations

- Founded: 2010 (incorporated)
- Type: First Nations non-profit organization
- Headquarters: Akwesasne, Ontario
- Key people: Leona Star (Chairperson)
- Website: https://fnigc.ca/

The First Nations Information Governance Centre (FNIGC) is an Ontario, Canada-based non-profit organization working in the field of First Nations data sovereignty. The organization is known for its comprehensive national surveys, which include the First Nations Regional Health Survey (FNRHS), and focus on the health and socio-economic conditions of First Nations people in Canada.

== History ==
In 1996, the Assembly of First Nations (AFN) provided a mandate for a national First Nations and Inuit health survey. A National Steering Committee (NSC) was thus formed. In 2000, the NSC transitioned into the First Nations Information Governance Committee at the AFN. In 2009, the AFN Chiefs-in-Assembly passed a resolution (Resolution #48, December 2009) which mandated the creation of the First Nations Information Governance Centre, an independent non-profit to replace the First Nations Information Governance Committee. On April 22, 2010, the First Nations Information Governance Centre was incorporated as a non-profit entity.

== Work ==
FNIGC has ten First Nations regional partners that collectively conduct the First Nations Regional Health Survey (FNRHS), the First Nations Early Childhood, Education and Employment Survey (FNREEES), the First Nations Community Survey (FNCS), and the First Nations Labour and Employment Development Survey (FNLED). These surveys examine physical and mental health, employment and income, housing, and other socio-economic factors influencing the health and well-being of First Nations people in Canada. Grounded in principles of Indigenous data governance, these initiatives aimed to secure First nations' authority over the collection, management, analysis and use of their data.

== Data governance ==
FNIGC also provides a variety of education and training services related to the First Nations principles of OCAP (ownership, control, access and possession), a foundational set of guidelines essential to supporting First Nations data sovereignty by establishing how First Nations data and information are collected, protected, used, shared, and governed within evolving digital systems.

In addition to OCAP Principles, FNIGC's work aligns with international frameworks such as CARE Principle for Indigenous Governance. Developed through the Research Data Alliance, the CARE Principles provide a people and purpose-oriented approach to data governance. They emphasize that data ecosystem should support Indigenous self-determination, ensure equitable outcomes, and respect Indigenous rights and interests in data.
