= Canadian Indian residential school system =

Schools to assimilate Indigenous children

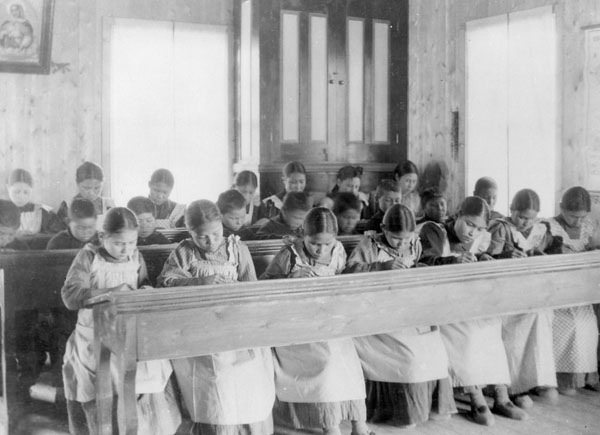
A Catholic Indian residential school in Fort Resolution, Northwest Territories

The Canadian Indian residential school system (Note: Indian is used here because of the historical nature of the article and the precision of the name, as with Indian hospital. It was, and continues to be, used by government officials, Indigenous peoples and historians while referencing the school system. The use of the name also provides relevant context about the era in which the system was established, specifically one in which Indigenous peoples in Canada were homogeneously referred to as Indians rather than by language that distinguishes First Nations, Inuit and Métis peoples. Use of Indian is limited throughout the article to proper nouns and references to government legislation.) was a network of boarding schools for Indigenous peoples (Note: Indigenous has been capitalized in keeping with the style guide of the Government of Canada. The capitalization also aligns with the style used within the final report of the Truth and Reconciliation Commission of Canada and the United Nations Declaration on the Rights of Indigenous Peoples. In the Canadian context, Indigenous is capitalized when discussing peoples, beliefs or communities in the same way European or Canadian is used to refer to non-Indigenous topics or people.) funded by the Canadian government's Department of Indian Affairs and administered by various Christian churches from the 19th to mid-20th century. The school system was created as a civilizing mission to isolate Indigenous children from the influence of their own culture and religion in order to assimilate them into the dominant Euro-Canadian culture. The Truth and Reconciliation Commission of Canada, established in 2008, concluded in a 2015 report that the system was a cultural genocide of Indigenous peoples.

The system began with laws before Confederation and was mainly active after the Indian Act was passed in 1876. Attendance at these schools became compulsory in 1894, and many schools were located far from Indigenous communities, in part to limit cultural contact. By the 1930s, about 30 percent of Indigenous children were attending residential schools. The last federally-funded residential school closed in 1997, with schools operating across most provinces and territories. Over the course of the system's more than 160-year history, around 150,000 children were placed in residential schools nationally.

The schools caused significant harm to Indigenous children by removing them from their families and cultures. Cases of physical and sexual abuse are documented. During their stay many students were forced to assimilate to Euro-Canadian culture, losing their Indigenous identities and struggling to fit into both their own communities as well as Canadian society. This disruption has contributed to ongoing issues like post-traumatic stress and substance abuse in Indigenous communities. Over 4,000 student deaths have been documented, with estimates that the full number is over 6,000. The vast majority of these fatalities were caused by diseases such as tuberculosis.

There is a form of historical denialism which downplays or misrepresents the reality of the residential school system. Starting in 2008, there were official apologies from politicians and religious groups for their roles in the system and efforts have been ongoing to identify unmarked graves at former school sites. There is scholarly debate over whether the system was part of a genocide of Canada's Indigenous peoples. Pope Francis acknowledged the system as genocide in 2022 and the House of Commons called for recognition of the residential school system as genocide in October 2022.

== History ==
External videos
- ""Residential Schools in Canada: A Timeline"" (2020) – Historica Canada (3:59min)

Attempts to assimilate Indigenous peoples were rooted in imperial colonialism centred around European worldviews and cultural practices, and a concept of land ownership based on the discovery doctrine. As explained in the executive summary of the Truth and Reconciliation Commission of Canada's (TRC) final report: "Underlying these arguments was the belief that the colonizers were bringing civilization to savage people who could never civilize themselves ... a belief of racial and cultural superiority."

Assimilation efforts began as early as the 17th century with the arrival of French missionaries in New France. They were resisted by Indigenous communities who were unwilling to leave their children for extended periods. The establishment of day and boarding schools by groups including the Recollets, Jesuits and Ursulines was largely abandoned by the 1690s. The political instability and realities of colonial life also played a role in the decision to halt the education programs. An increase in orphaned and foundling colonial children limited church resources, and colonists benefited from favourable relations with Indigenous peoples in both the fur trade and military pursuits.

Educational programs were not widely attempted again by religious officials until the 1820s, prior to the introduction of state-sanctioned operations. Included among them was a school established by John West, an Anglican missionary, at the Red River Colony in what is today Manitoba. Protestant missionaries also opened residential schools in what is now the province of Ontario, spreading Christianity and working to encourage Indigenous peoples to adopt subsistence agriculture as a way to ensure they would not return to their original, nomadic ways of life upon graduation.

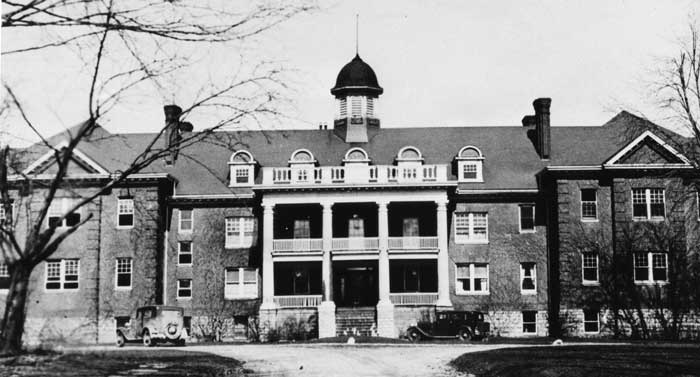
Mohawk Institute Residential School, c. 1943

Although many of these early schools were open for only a short time, efforts persisted. The Mohawk Institute Residential School, the oldest continuously operated residential school in Canada, opened in 1834 on Six Nations of the Grand River near Brantford, Ontario. Administered by the Anglican Church, the facility opened as the Mechanics' Institute, a day school for boys, in 1828 and became a boarding school four years later when it accepted its first boarders and began admitting female students. It remained in operation until June 30, 1970.

The renewed interest in residential schools in the early 1800s can be linked to the decline in military hostility faced by the settlers, particularly after the War of 1812. With the threat of invasion by American forces minimized, Indigenous communities were no longer viewed as allies but as barriers to permanent settlement. This change was also associated with the transfer of responsibility for interactions with Indigenous communities from military officials, familiar with and sympathetic to their customs and way of life, to civilian representatives concerned only with permanent colonial settlement.

Beginning in the late 1800s, the Canadian government's Department of Indian Affairs (DIA) officially encouraged the growth of the residential school system as a valuable component in a wider policy of integrating Indigenous people into European Canadian society. The TRC found that the schools, and the removal of children from their families, amounted to cultural genocide, a conclusion that echoed the words of historian John S. Milloy, who argued that the system's aim was to "kill the Indian in the child." (Note: The phrase "kill the Indian in the child" originates from a letter written by Richard Henry Pratt (founder of the Carlisle Indian Industrial School in Pennsylvania) while recounting the views of an unidentified American general who believed "that the only good Indian is a dead one," of which Pratt wrote: "In a sense, I agree with the sentiment, but only in this: that all the Indian there is in the race should be dead. Kill the Indian in him, and save the man." Mark Abley writes that in a Canadian context "kill the Indian in the child" has been erroneously attributed to former deputy superintendent of the Department of Indian Affairs, Duncan Campbell Scott.) Over the course of the system's more than hundred-year existence, around 150,000 children were placed in residential schools nationally. As the system was designed as an assimilation program, Indigenous children were in many schools prohibited from, and sometimes punished for, speaking their own languages or practising their own faiths. The primary goal was to convert Indigenous children to Christianity and acculturate them.

Number of schools and residences 1867–1998

Many of the government-funded residential schools were run by churches of various denominations. Between 1867 and 1939, the number of schools operating at one time peaked at 80 in 1931. Of those schools, 44 were operated by 16 Catholic dioceses and about three dozen Catholic religious communities; 21 were operated by the Church of England / Anglican Church of Canada; 13 were operated by the United Church of Canada, and 2 were operated by Presbyterians. The approach of using established school facilities set up by missionaries was employed by the federal government for economic expedience: the government provided facilities and maintenance, while the churches provided teachers and their own lesson-planning. As a result, the number of schools per denomination was less a reflection of their presence in the general population, but rather their legacy of missionary work.

=== Government involvement ===
Although the British North America Act, 1867 made education in Canada the jurisdiction of the provincial governments, the Indigenous peoples and their treaties fell under the jurisdiction of the federal government. As a condition of several treaties, the federal government agreed to provide for Indigenous education. Residential schools were funded under the Indian Act by what was then the federal Department of the Interior. Adopted in 1876 as An Act to amend and consolidate the laws respecting Indians, it consolidated all previous laws placing Indigenous communities, land and finances under federal control. As explained by the TRC, the act "made Indians wards of the state, unable to vote in provincial or federal elections or enter the professions if they did not surrender their status, and severely limited their freedom to participate in spiritual and cultural practices."

The report commissioned by Governor General Charles Bagot, titled Report on the affairs of the Indians in Canada and referred to as the Bagot Report, is seen as the foundational document for the federal residential school system. It was supported by James Bruce, 8th Earl of Elgin, who had been impressed by industrial schools in the West Indies, and Egerton Ryerson, who was then the Chief Superintendent of Education in Upper Canada. This letter was published in 1898 as an appendix to a larger report entitled Statistics Respecting Indian Schools.

Front cover of Statistics Respecting Indian Schools, 1898, including Egerton Ryerson's letter "Report by Dr Ryerson on Industrial Schools"

The Gradual Civilization Act of 1857 and the Gradual Enfranchisement Act of 1869 formed the foundations for this system prior to Confederation. These acts assumed the inherent superiority of French and British ways, and the need for Indigenous peoples to become French or English speakers, Christians, and farmers. At the time, many Indigenous leaders argued to have these acts overturned. The Gradual Civilization Act awarded 50 acres (200,000 m^{2}) of land to any Indigenous male deemed "sufficiently advanced in the elementary branches of education" and would automatically enfranchise him, removing any tribal affiliation or treaty rights. With this legislation, and through the creation of residential schools, the government believed Indigenous peoples could eventually become assimilated into the general population. Individual allotments of farmland would require changes in the communal reserve system, something fiercely opposed by First Nations governments.

Map of residential schools, including gravesites. This map can be expanded and interacted with. Ground anomaly discoveries Investigations underway as of July 30, 2021 Investigations that concluded with no discoveries Other Indian Residential Schools Data

In January 1879, John A. Macdonald, Prime Minister of what was then post-Confederation Canada, commissioned politician Nicholas Flood Davin to write a report regarding the industrial boarding-school system in the United States. Now known as the Davin Report, the Report on Industrial Schools for Indians and Half-Breeds was submitted to Ottawa on March 14, 1879, and made the case for a cooperative approach between the Canadian government and the church to implement the assimilation pursued by President of the United States Ulysses S. Grant. Davin's report relied heavily on findings he acquired through consultations with government officials and representatives of the Five Civilized Tribes in Washington, DC, and church officials in Winnipeg, Manitoba. He visited only one industrial day school, in Minnesota, before submitting his findings. In his report Davin concluded that the best way to assimilate Indigenous peoples was to start with children in a residential setting, away from their families.

Davin's findings were supported by Vital-Justin Grandin, who felt that while the likelihood of civilizing adults was low, there was hope when it came to Indigenous children. He explained in a letter to Public Works Minister Hector-Louis Langevin that the best course of action would be to make children "lead a life different from their parents and cause them to forget the customs, habits & language of their ancestors." In 1883 Parliament approved $43,000 for three industrial schools and the first, Battleford Industrial School, opened on December 1 of that year. By 1900, there were 61 schools in operation.

The government began purchasing church-run boarding schools in the 1920s. During this period capital costs associated with the schools were assumed by the government, leaving administrative and instructional duties to church officials. The hope was that minimizing facility expenditures would allow church administrators to provide higher quality instruction and support to the students in their care. Although the government was willing to, and did, purchase schools from the churches, many were acquired for free given that the rampant disrepair present in the buildings resulted in their having no economic value. Schools continued to be maintained by churches in instances where they failed to reach an agreement with government officials with the understanding that the government would provide support for capital costs. The understanding ultimately proved complicated due to the lack of written agreements outlining the extent and nature of that support or the approvals required to undertake expensive renovations and repairs.

By the 1930s, government officials recognized that the residential school system was financially unsustainable and failing to meet the intended goal of training and assimilating Indigenous children into European-Canadian society. Robert Hoey, Superintendent of Welfare and Training in the Indian Affairs Branch of the federal Department of Mines and Resources, opposed the expansion of new schools, noting in 1936 that "to build educational institutions, particularly residential schools, while the money at our disposal is insufficient to keep the schools already erected in a proper state of repair, is, to me, very unsound and a practice difficult to justify." He proposed the expansion of day schools, an approach to educating Indigenous children that he would continue to pursue after being promoted to director of the welfare and training branch in 1945. The proposal was resisted by the United Church, the Anglican Church, and the Missionary Oblates of Mary Immaculate, who believed that the solution to the system's failure was not restructuring but intensification.

Between 1945 and 1955, the number of First Nations students in day schools run by Indian Affairs expanded from 9,532 to 17,947. This growth in student population was accompanied by an amendment to the Indian Act in 1951 that allowed federal officials to establish agreements with provincial and territorial governments and school boards regarding the education of Indigenous students in the public school system. These changes marked the government's shift in policy from assimilation-driven education at residential schools to the integration of Indigenous students into public schools.

Despite the shift in policy from educational assimilation to integration, the removal of Indigenous children from their families by state officials continued through much of the 1960s and 70s. The removals were the result of the 1951 addition of section 88 of the Indian Act, which allowed for the application of provincial laws to Indigenous peoples living on reserves in instances where federal laws were not in place. The change included the monitoring of child welfare. With no requirement for specialized training regarding the traditions or lifestyles of the communities they entered, provincial officials assessed the welfare of Indigenous children based on Euro-Canadian values that, for example, deemed traditional diets of game, fish and berries insufficient and grounds for taking children into custody. This period resulted in the widespread removal of Indigenous children from their traditional communities called the Sixties Scoop. Often taken without the consent of their parents or community elders, some children were placed in state-run child welfare facilities, increasingly operated in former residential schools, while others were fostered or placed up for adoption by predominantly non-Indigenous families throughout Canada and the United States. While the Indian and Northern Affairs estimates that 11,132 children were adopted between 1960 and 1990, the actual number may be as high as 20,000.

In 1969, after years of sharing power with churches, the Department of Indian Affairs took sole control of the residential school system and established community advisory boards. In response to a protest at Blue Quills residential school in 1970, the Department transferred control of some schools to their communities, but others continued to be operated by government until Kivalliq Hall closed in 1997.

Residential schools operated in every Canadian province and territory with the exception of New Brunswick and Prince Edward Island. It is estimated that the number of residential schools reached its peak in the early 1930s with 80 schools and more than 17,000 enrolled students. About 150,000 children are believed to have attended a residential school over the course of the system's existence.

=== Parental resistance and compulsory attendance ===
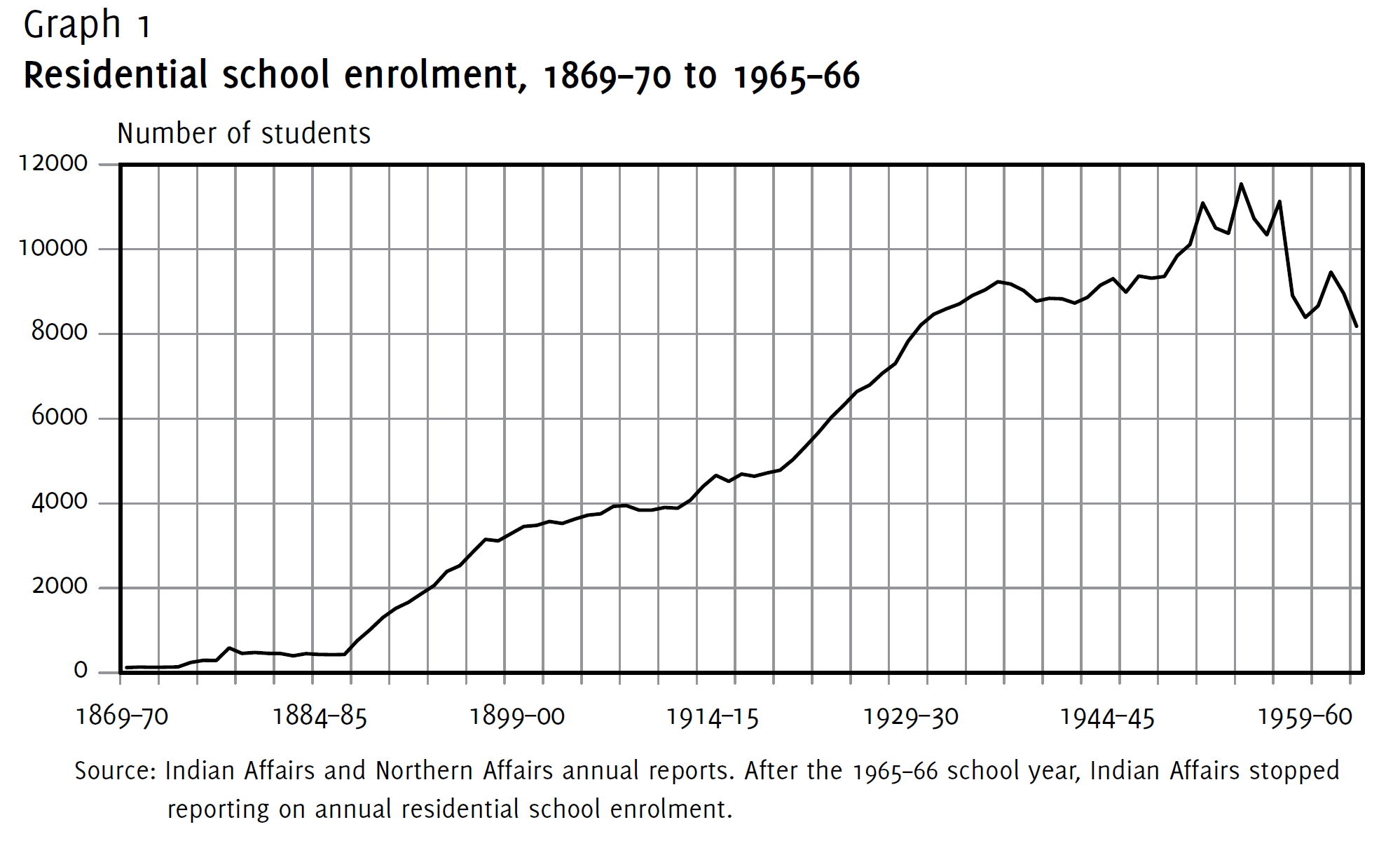
Enrolment 1869–1960

Some parents and families of Indigenous children resisted the residential school system throughout its existence. Children were kept from schools and, in some cases, hidden from government officials tasked with rounding up children on reserves. Parents regularly advocated for increased funding for schools, including the increase of centrally located day schools to improve access to their children, and made repeated requests for improvements to the quality of education, food, and clothing being provided at the schools. Demands for answers in regards to claims of abuse were often dismissed as a ploy by parents seeking to keep their children at home, with government and school officials positioned as those who knew best.

In 1894, amendments to the Indian Act made attendance at a day school, if there was a day school on the reserve on which the child resided, compulsory for status Indian children between 7 and 16 years of age. The changes included a series of exemptions regarding school location, the health of the children and their prior completion of school examinations. It was changed to children between 6 and 15 years of age in 1908. The introduction of mandatory attendance at a day school on the reserve was the result of pressure from missionary representatives. Reliant on student enrolment quotas to secure funding, they were struggling to attract new students due to increasingly poor school conditions.

The introduction of the Family Allowance Act in 1945 stipulated that school-aged children had to be enrolled in school for families to qualify for the "baby bonus", further coercing Indigenous parents into having their children attend.

== Conditions ==
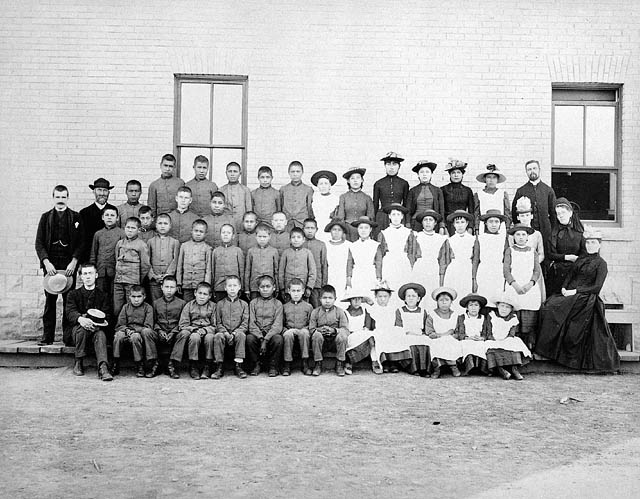
St. Paul's Indian Industrial School, Middlechurch, Manitoba, 1901

Students in the residential school system were faced with a multitude of abuses by teachers and administrators, including sexual and physical assault. They suffered from malnourishment and harsh discipline that would not have been tolerated in any other Canadian school system. Corporal punishment was often justified by a belief that it was the only way to save souls or punish and deter runaways – whose injuries or death, sustained in their efforts to return home would become the legal responsibility of the school. Overcrowding, poor sanitation, inadequate heating, and a lack of medical care led to high rates of influenza and tuberculosis; in one school, the death rate reached 69 percent. Federal policies that tied funding to enrollment numbers led to sick children being enrolled to boost numbers, thus introducing and spreading disease. The problem of unhealthy children was further exacerbated by the conditions of the schools themselves – overcrowding and poor ventilation, water quality and sewage systems.

Until the late 1950s, when the federal government shifted to a day school integration model, residential schools were severely underfunded and often relied on the forced labour of their students to maintain their facilities, although it was presented as training for artisanal skills. The work was arduous, and severely compromised the academic and social development of the students. School books and textbooks were drawn mainly from the curricula of the provincially funded public schools for non-Indigenous students, and teachers at the residential schools were often poorly trained or prepared. During this period, Canadian government scientists performed nutritional tests on students and kept some students undernourished as the control sample.

Details of the mistreatment of students were published numerous times throughout the 20th century by government officials reporting on school conditions. Residential school staff were occasionally charged with crimes against students starting in 1945 and survivors began suing staff and the Canadian government in 1998.

The conditions and impact of residential schools were also brought to light in popular culture as early as 1967, with the publication of "The Lonely Death of Chanie Wenjack" by Ian Adams in Maclean's and the Indians of Canada Pavilion at Expo 67. In the 1990s, investigations and memoirs by former students revealed that many students at residential schools were subjected to severe physical, psychological, and sexual abuse by school staff members and by older students. Among the former students to come forward was Phil Fontaine, then Grand Chief of the Assembly of Manitoba Chiefs, who in October 1990 publicly discussed the abuse he and others suffered while attending Fort Alexander Indian Residential School.

After the government closed most of the schools in the 1960s, the work of Indigenous activists and historians led to greater awareness by the public of the damage the schools had caused, as well as to official government and church apologies, and a legal settlement. These gains were achieved through the persistent organizing and advocacy by Indigenous communities to draw attention to the residential school system's legacy of abuse, including their participation in hearings of the Royal Commission on Aboriginal Peoples.

Canada's residential schools have been compared to or described as re-education camps.

=== Funding ===
The Truth and Reconciliation Commission list three reasons behind the federal government's decision to establish residential schools.

1. Provide Aboriginal people with skills to participate in a market-based economy.
2. Further political assimilation, in hope that educated students would give up their status and not return to their reserves or families.
3. Schools were "engines of cultural and spiritual change" where "'savages' were to emerge as Christian 'white men'".

In addition to these three the Commission stated a national security element and quoted Andsell Macrae, a commissioner with Indian Affairs: "it is unlikely that any Tribe or Tribes would give trouble of a serious nature to the Government whose members had children completely under Government control."

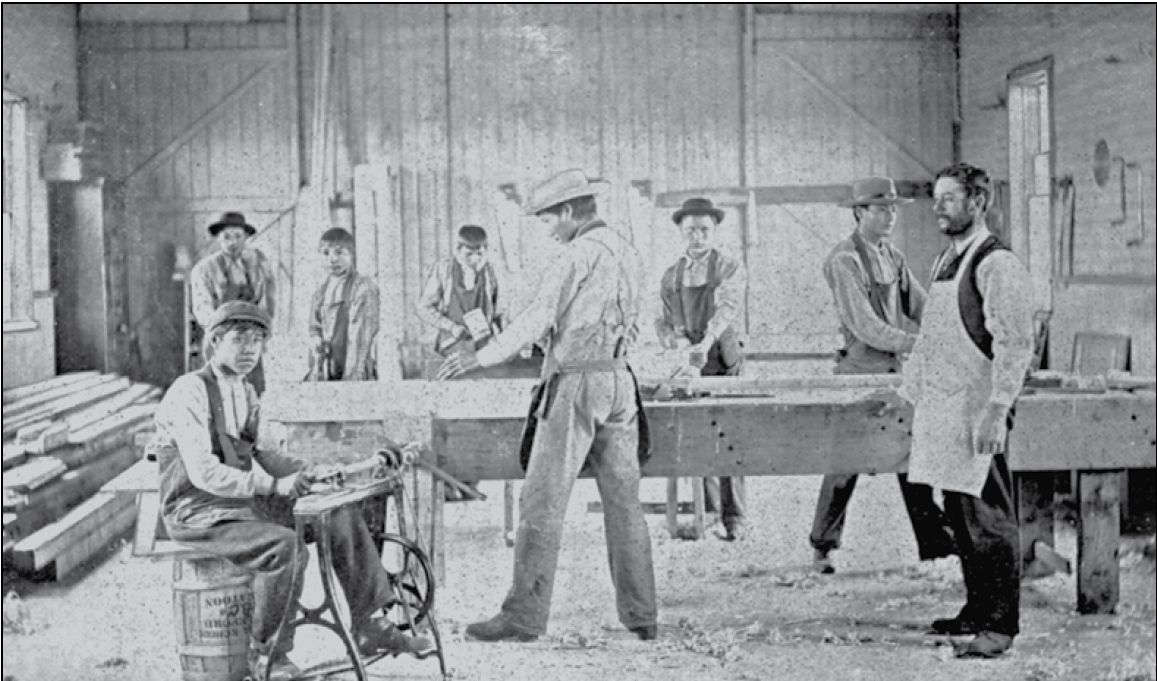
Anglican-run Battleford Industrial School, Carpenter's shop, circa 1894

The federal government sought to cut costs by adopting the residential industrial school system of the United States. Indian Commissioner Edgar Dewdney aspired to have the residential schools, through forced labour, be financially independent a few years after opening. The government believed through the industrial system and cheap labour costs of missionary staff it could "operate a residential school system on a nearly cost-free basis." Students "were expected to raise or grow and prepare most of the food they ate, to make and repair much of their clothing, and to maintain the schools." Most schools did this through a system where students studied for half the day and did "vocational training" for the other half. This system failed and the schools never became self-supporting.

By 1891, the government cut already low salaries, stopped covering operating costs, and implemented a fixed amount of funding per student. This policy drove competition and encouraged the admission of students that were deemed "too young or too sick." The chronic underfunding developed a health crisis within the schools and a financial crisis within the missionary groups. In 1911, in an attempt to alleviate the health crisis, the federal government increased per capita grant funding. However, the funding did not adjust for inflation. In the 1930s, throughout the Great Depression and World War II, it was repeatedly reduced, and by 1937, the per capita grant averaged just $180 per student per year. For perspective, per-capita costs for comparable institutions included: Manitoba School for the Deaf: $642, Manitoba School for Boys: $550, U.S. Chilocco Indian Agricultural School: $350. The Child Welfare League of America stated per capita costs for "well-run institutions" ranged between $313 and $541; Canada was paying 57.5% of the minimum figure. Changes in per capita costs did not occur until the 1950s and were seen as insignificant. In 1966, Saskatchewan residential schools per capita costs ranged from $694 and $1,193, which is 7–36% of what other Canadian child-welfare institutions were paying ($3,300 and $9,855) and 5–25% of what U.S. residential care was paying ($4,500 and $14,059.)

Government officials believed that since many staff members belonged to religious orders with vows of poverty or missionary organizations, pay was relatively unimportant. Thus, almost all staff were poorly paid, and schools had trouble recruiting and retaining staff. In 1948, C.H. Birdsall, chair of the United Church committee responsible for the Edmonton school, in regard to the lack of funding for salaries, accommodations, and equipment, stated that it was "doubtful the present work with Indian Children could properly be called education." In 1948, Sechelt school staff were paying full-time staff a salary of $1800. In the 1960s, Christie school staff were paid $50 a month.

The per capita grant system severely decreased the education quality. British Columbia Indian Superintendent Arthur Wellesley Vowell in response to one of his agents recommending they only approve qualified teaching staff stated that that would require more funding and that Indian Affairs did not "entertain requests for increased grants to Indian boarding and industrial schools." The pay was so low relative to provincial schools that many of the teachers lacked any teaching qualifications.

Federal cuts to funding during the Great Depression resulted in students paying the price. By 1937, at the Kamloops Indian Residential School, milk production among the schools dairy herds was reduced by 50%. The federal government refused to fund construction for an additional barn to increase milk production and isolate the sick animals. Even among other schools dairy herds, funding was so low that milk was separated with "skimmed milk served to the children" and the fat turned to dairy products sold to fund the schools. In 1939, the Presbyterian school in Kenora began charging students 10 cents a loaf until their Indian agent ordered the school to stop.

=== Family visitation ===
Parents and family members regularly travelled to the schools, often camping outside to be closer to their children. So many parents made the trip that Indian Commissioner Hayter Reed argued that the schools should be moved farther from the reserves to make visiting more difficult. He also objected to allowing children to return home during school breaks and holidays because he believed the trips interrupted their assimilation.

Visitation, for those who could make the journey, was strictly controlled by school officials in a manner similar to the procedures enforced in the prison system. In some cases schools denied parents access to their children altogether. Others required families to meet with them in the presence of school officials and speak only in English; parents who could not speak in English were unable to talk to their children. The obstacles families faced to visit their children were further exacerbated by the pass system. Introduced by Reed, without legislative authority to do so, the pass system restricted and closely monitored the movement of Indigenous peoples off reserves. Launched in 1885 as a response to the North-West Rebellion, and later replaced by permits, the system was designed to prevent Indigenous people from leaving reserves without a pass issued by a local Indian agent.

=== Instruction style and outcomes ===
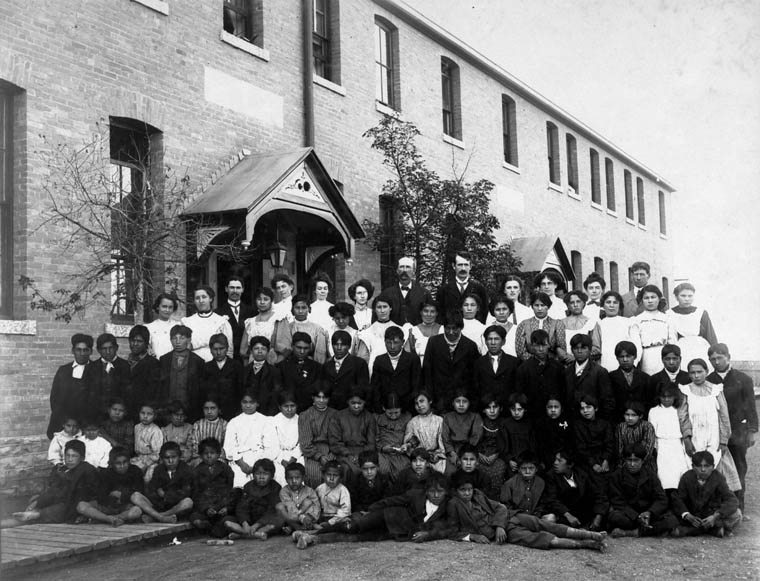
Residential school group photograph, Regina, Saskatchewan, 1908

Instruction provided to students was rooted in an institutional and European approach to education. It differed dramatically from child rearing in traditional knowledge systems based on 'look, listen, and learn' models. Corporal punishment and loss of privileges characterized the residential school system, while traditional Indigenous approaches to education favour positive guidance toward desired behaviour through game-based play, story-telling, and formal ritualized ceremonies. While at school, many children had no contact with their families for up to 10 months at a time, and in some cases had no contact for years. The impact of the disconnect from their families was furthered by students being discouraged or prohibited from speaking Indigenous languages, even among themselves and outside the classroom, so that English or French would be learned and their own languages forgotten. In some schools, they were subject to physical violence for speaking their own languages or for practicing non-Christian faiths.

Most schools operated with the stated goal of providing students with the vocational training and social skills required to obtain employment and integrate into Canadian society after graduation. In actuality, these goals were poorly and inconsistently achieved. Many graduates were unable to land a job due to poor educational training. Returning home was equally challenging due to an unfamiliarity with their culture and, in some cases, an inability to communicate with family members using their traditional language. Instead of intellectual achievement and advancement, it was often physical appearance and dress, like that of middle class, urban teenagers, or the promotion of a Christian ethic, that was used as a sign of successful assimilation. As the father of a pupil who attended Battleford Industrial School, in Saskatchewan, for five years explained: "he cannot read, speak or write English, nearly all his time having been devoted to herding and caring for cattle instead of learning a trade or being otherwise educated. Such employment he can get at home." There is some evidence that residential schooling increased the probability of employment, but this effect disappeared in the context of more abusive schools. The First Nations Information Governance Centre found no significant difference in the percentage of adults who finished high school based on residential school attendance.

=== Experimentation ===
Both academic research and the final report of the Truth and Reconciliation Committee relay evidence that students were included in several scientific research experiments without their knowledge, their consent or the consent of their parents. These experiments include nutrition experiments which involved intentional malnourishment of children, vaccine trials for the BCG vaccine, as well as studies on extrasensory perception, vitamin D diet supplements, amebicides, isoniazid, hemoglobin, bedwetting, and dermatoglyphics.

== Mortality rates ==
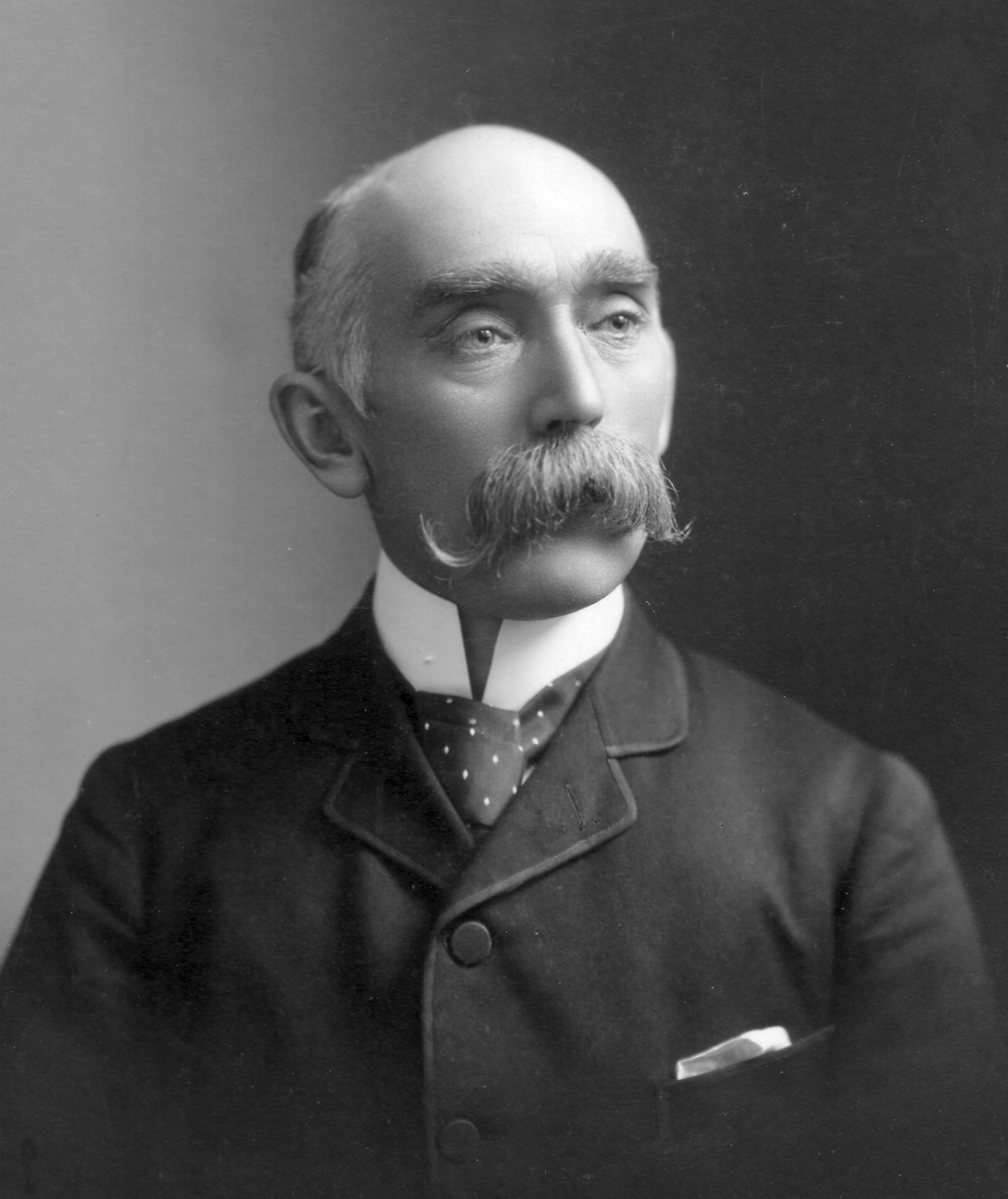
Chief medical officer Peter Bryce (1890)

Residential school deaths were common and have been linked to poorly constructed and maintained facilities. The actual number of deaths remains unknown due to inconsistent reporting by school officials and the destruction of medical and administrative records in compliance with retention and disposition policies for government records. Research by the TRC revealed that at least 4,118 students had died, mostly from disease. TRC chair Justice Murray Sinclair has suggested that the number of deaths may exceed 6,000. The vast majority of deaths occurred before the 1950s.

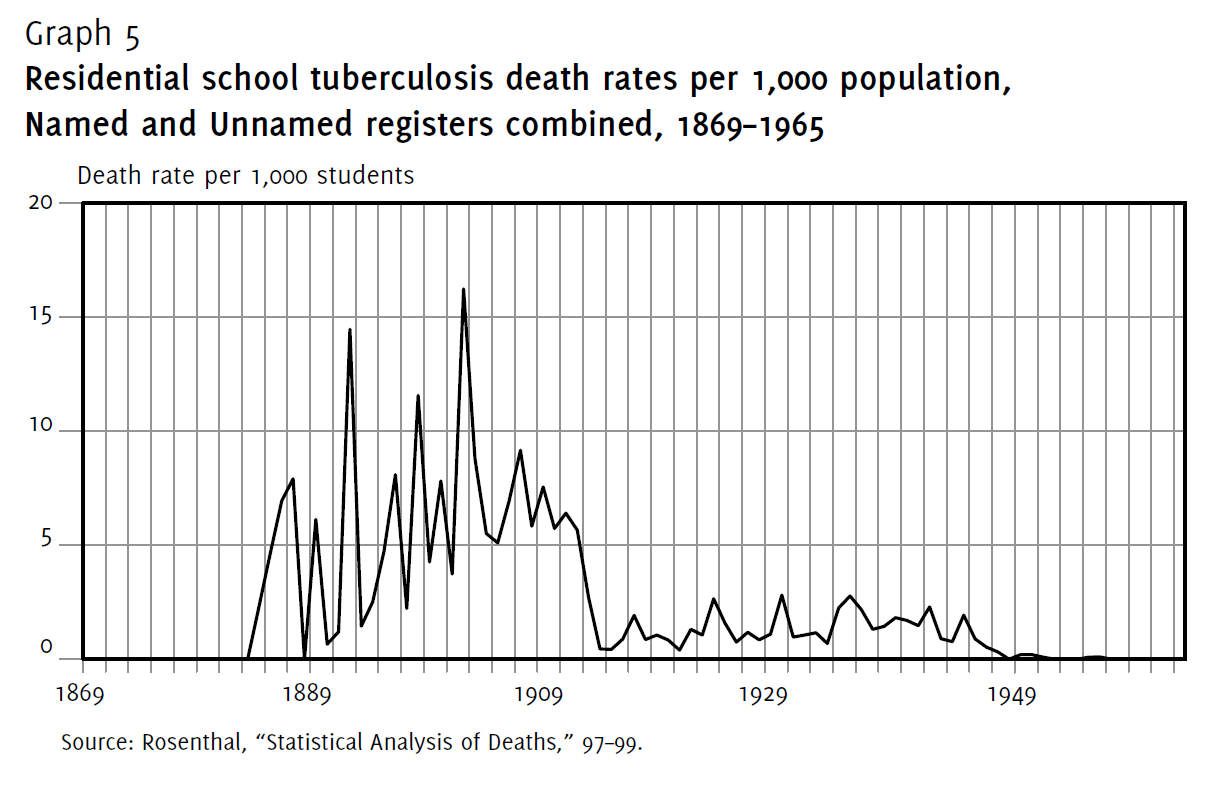
Tuberculosis death rates in residential schools (1869–1965)

The 1906 Annual Report of the Department of Indian Affairs, submitted by chief medical officer Peter Bryce, highlighted that the "Indian population of Canada has a mortality rate of more than double that of the whole population, and in some provinces more than three times". Among the list of causes he noted the infectious disease of tuberculosis and the role residential schools played in spreading the disease by way of poor ventilation and medical screening.

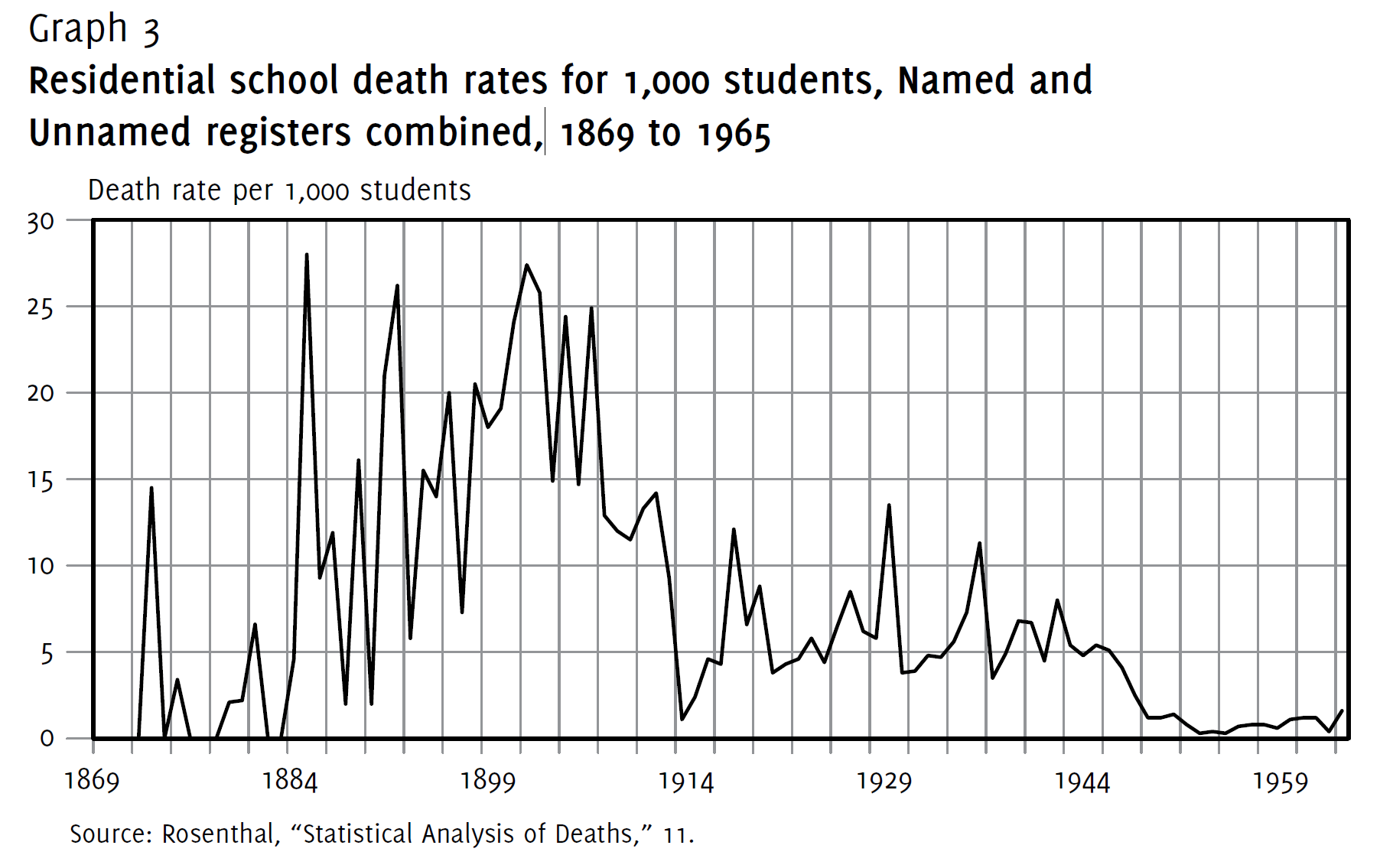
Death rates per 1,000 students in residential schools (1869–1965)

In 1907, Bryce reported on the conditions of Manitoba and North-West residential schools: "we have created a situation so dangerous to health that I was often surprised that the results were not even worse than they have been shown statistically to be." He reported that mortality rates at residential schools in western Canada ranged from 24 to 69 percent. These statistics did not become public until 1922, when Bryce, who was no longer working for the government, published The Story of a National Crime: Being a Record of the Health Conditions of the Indians of Canada from 1904 to 1921. In particular, he alleged that the high mortality rates could have been avoided if healthy children had not been exposed to children with tuberculosis. At the time, no antibiotic had been identified to treat the disease, and this exacerbated the impact of the illness. Streptomycin, the first effective treatment, was not introduced until 1943. The Truth and Reconciliation Commission of Canada reported the tuberculosis death rate for the First Nations population as 6.626 per 1,000 in 1943, 2.988 per 1,000 in 1950 and 0.42 per 1,000 in 1957.

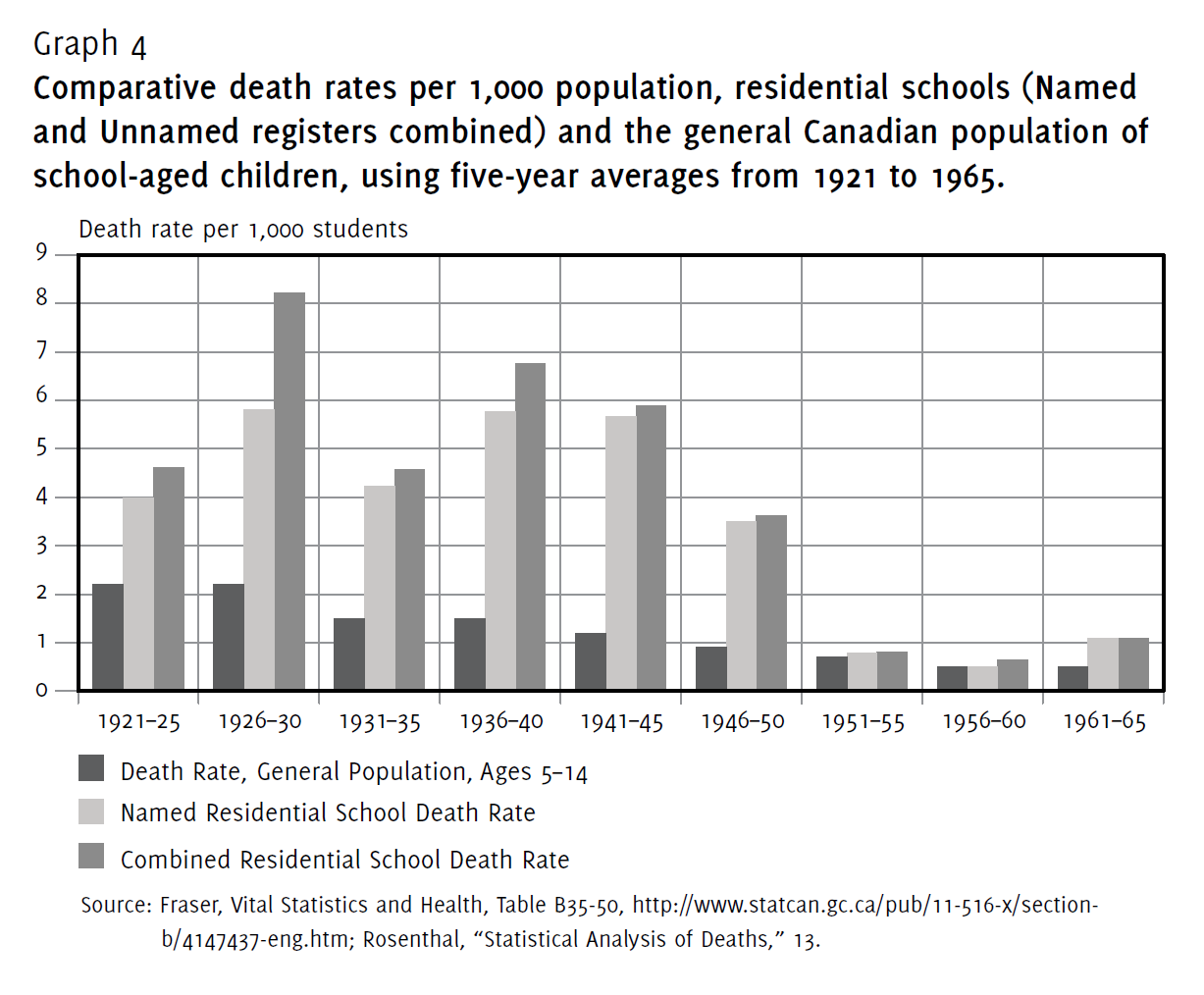
Comparative death rates per 1,000 for school aged children in Canada (1921–1965)

In 1920 and 1922, Regina physician F. A. Corbett was commissioned to visit the schools in the west of the country, and found similar results to those reported by Bryce. At the Ermineskin school in Hobbema, Alberta, he found that 50 percent of the children had tuberculosis. At Sarcee Boarding School near Calgary, he noted that all 33 students were "much below even a passable standard of health" and "[a]ll but four were infected with tuberculosis". In one classroom, he found 16 ill children, many near death, who were being forced to sit through lessons.

In 2011, reflecting on the TRC's research, Justice Sinclair told The Toronto Star: "Missing children – that is the big surprise for me ... That such large numbers of children died at the schools. That the information of their deaths was not communicated back to their families."

=== Missing children and unmarked graves ===
The Truth and Reconciliation Commission wrote that the policy of Indian Affairs was to refuse to return the bodies of children home due to the associated expense, and to instead require the schools to bear the cost of burials. The TRC concluded that it may be impossible to ever identify the number of deaths or missing children, in part because of the practice of burying students in unmarked graves. The work is further complicated by a pattern of poor record keeping by school and government officials, who neglected to keep reliable numbers about the number of children who died or where they were buried. While most schools had cemeteries on site, their location and extent remain difficult to determine as cemeteries that were originally marked were found to have been later razed, intentionally hidden or built over.

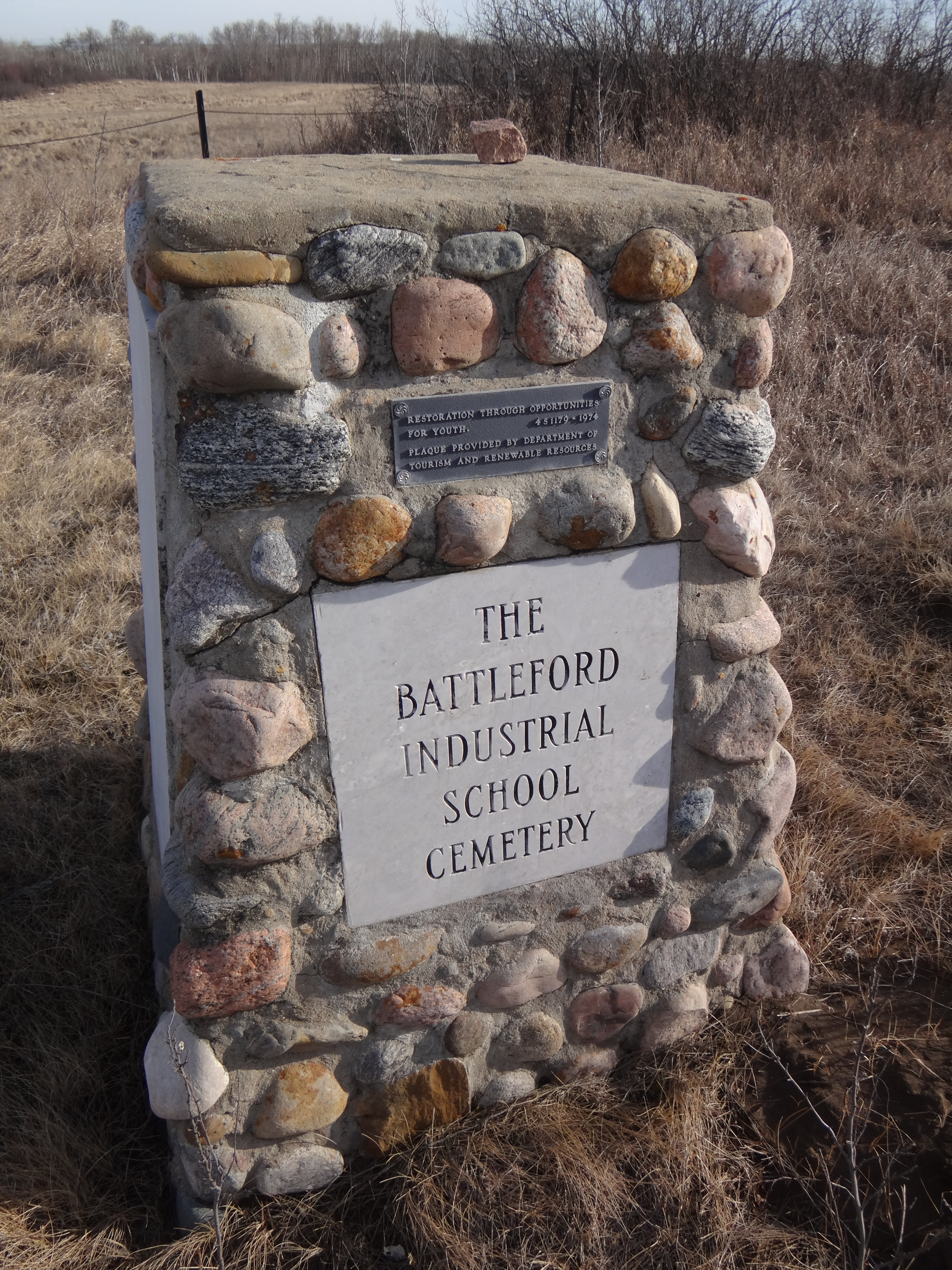
A cairn erected in 1975 marking the Battleford Industrial School cemetery

The fourth volume of the TRC's final report, dedicated to missing children and unmarked burials, was developed after the original TRC members realized, in 2007, that the issue required its own working group. In 2009, the TRC requested $1.5 million in extra funding from the federal government to complete this work, but was denied. The researchers concluded, after searching land near schools using satellite imagery and maps, that, "for the most part, the cemeteries that the Commission documented are abandoned, disused, and vulnerable to accidental disturbance".

Bodies began to be exhumed from residential school graves starting in 1974 and with ongoing efforts in the 1990s and 2000s. In May 2021, possible burial sites were found in the grounds of the Kamloops Indian Residential School in Kamloops, British Columbia, on the lands of the Tkʼemlúps te Secwépemc First Nation. The site was located with the assistance of a ground-penetrating radar specialist and Tk'emlups te Secwepemc Chief Rosanne Casimir wrote that the site was undocumented and that work was underway to determine if related records were held at the Royal British Columbia Museum. As of May 2024, no remains have been excavated.

On June 23, 2021, ground-penetrating radar suggested the presence of an estimated 751 unmarked graves on the site of Marieval Indian Residential School in Marieval, Saskatchewan, on the lands of Cowessess First Nation. Some of these graves predated the establishment of the residential school. On June 24, 2021, Chief Cadmus Delorme of Cowessess First Nation held a virtual press conference. From June 2 to 23 they found an estimated 751 unmarked graves. Delorme went on to state:

This is not a mass grave site, these are unmarked graves...in 1960, there may have been marks on these graves. The Catholic Church representatives removed these headstones and today they are unmarked graves... the machine has a 10 to 15 percent error...we do know there is at least 600... We cannot affirm that they are all children, but there are oral stories that there are adults in this gravesite... some may have went to the Church and from our local towns and they could have been buried here as well... We are going to put names on these unmarked graves.

On June 30, 2021, the Lower Kootenay Band reported 182 unmarked graves near Kootenay Indian Residential School in Cranbrook, British Columbia.

== Self-governance and school closure ==
When the government revised the Indian Act in the 1940s and 1950s, some bands, along with regional and national Indigenous organizations, wanted to maintain schools in their communities. Motivations for support of the schools included their role as a social service in communities that were suffering from extensive family breakdowns; the significance of the schools as employers; and the inadequacy of other opportunities for children to receive education.

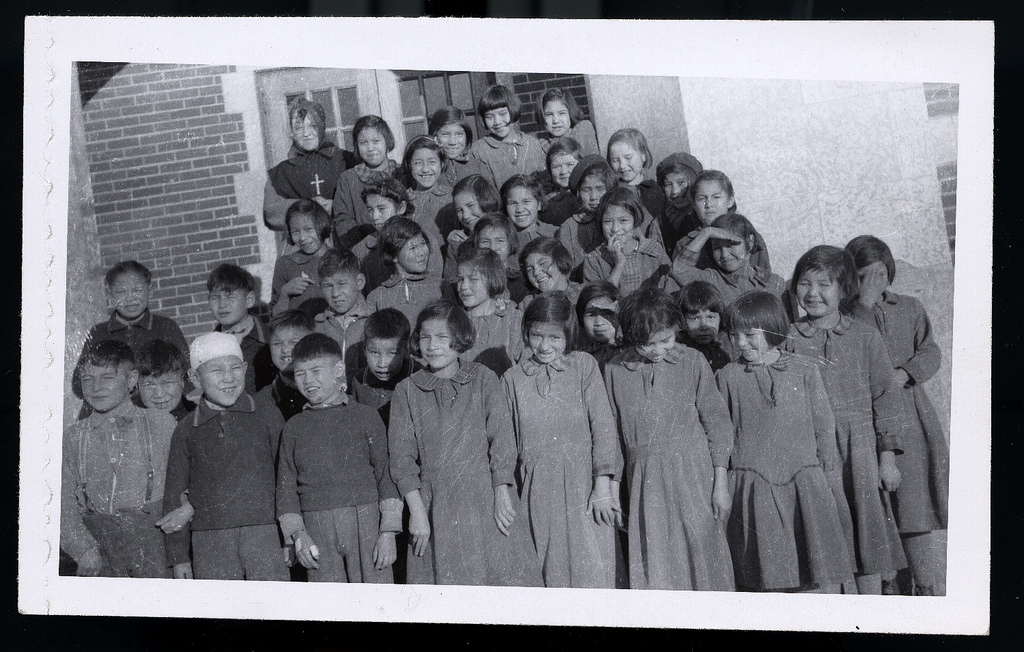
Students at the Blue Quills residential school in Alberta

In the 1960s, a major confrontation took place at the Saddle Lake Reserve in Alberta. After several years of deteriorating conditions and administrative changes, parents protested against the lack of transparency at the Blue Quills Indian School in 1969. In response, the government decided to close the school, convert the building into a residence, and enroll students in a public school 5 kilometres (3 mi) away in St. Paul, Alberta. The TRC report pertaining to this period states:

Fearing their children would face racial discrimination in St. Paul, parents wished to see the school transferred to a private society that would operate it both as a school and a residence. The federal government had been open to such a transfer if the First Nations organization was structured as a provincial school division. The First Nations rejected this, saying that a transfer of First Nations education to the provincial authority was a violation of Treaty rights.

In the summer of 1970, members of Saddle Lake Cree Nation occupied the building and demanded the right to run it themselves. More than 1,000 people participated in the 17-day sit-in, which lasted from July 14 to 31. Their efforts resulted in Blue Quills becoming the first Indigenous-administered school in the country. It continues to operate today as University nuhelotʼįne thaiyotsʼį nistameyimâkanak Blue Quills, the first Indigenous-governed university in Canada. Following the success of the Blue Quills effort the National Indian Brotherhood (NIB) released the 1972 paper Indian Control of Indian Education that responded, in part, to the Canadian Government's 1969 White Paper calling for the abolishment of the land treaties and the Indian Act. The NIB paper underscored the right of Indigenous communities to locally direct how their children are educated and served as the integral reference for education policy moving forward.

Few other former residential schools have converted to independently operated community schools for Indigenous children. White Calf Collegiate in Lebret, Saskatchewan, was run by Star Blanket Cree Nation from 1973 until its closure in 1998, after being run by the Oblates from 1884 to 1969. Old Sun Community College is run by Siksika Nation in Alberta in a building designed by architect Roland Guerney Orr. From 1929 to 1971 the building housed Old Sun residential school, first run by the Anglicans and taken over by the federal government in 1969. It was converted to adult learning and stood as a campus of Mount Royal College from 1971 to 1978, at which point the Siksika Nation took over operations. In 1988, the Old Sun College Act was passed in the Alberta Legislature recognizing Old Sun Community College as a First Nations College.

== Lasting effects ==
Survivors of residential schools and their families have been found to suffer from historical trauma with a lasting and adverse effect on the transmission of Indigenous culture between generations. A 2010 study led by Gwen Reimer explained historic trauma, passed on intergenerationally, as the process through which "cumulative stress and grief experienced by Aboriginal communities is translated into a collective experience of cultural disruption and a collective memory of powerlessness and loss". This trauma has been used to explain the persistent negative social and cultural impacts of colonial rule and residential schools, including the prevalence of sexual abuse, alcoholism, drug addiction, lateral violence, mental illness and suicide among Indigenous peoples.

The 2012 national report of the First Nations Regional Health Study found that respondents who attended residential schools were more likely than those who did not to have been diagnosed with at least one chronic medical condition. A sample of 127 survivors revealed that half have criminal records; 65 per cent have been diagnosed with post-traumatic stress disorder; 21 per cent have been diagnosed with major depression; 7 percent have been diagnosed with anxiety disorder; and 7 percent have been diagnosed with borderline personality disorder.

In a 2014 article, Anishinaabe psychiatry researcher Amy Bombay reviewed research that relates to the intergenerational effects. She found that, "In addition to negative effects observed among those who attended IRS, accumulating evidence suggests that the children of those who attended (IRS offspring) are also at greater risk for poor well-being." 37.2% of adults with at least one parent who attended a boarding school contemplated committing suicide in their lifetimes, compared to 25.7% of people whose parents did not attend residential boarding schools. Higher levels of depression symptoms and psychological trauma were evident among Indian residential school survivors' children.

=== Loss of language and culture ===
Although some schools permitted students to speak their Indigenous languages, suppressing their languages and culture was a key tactic used to assimilate Indigenous children. Many students spoke the language of their families fluently when they first entered residential schools. The schools strictly prohibited the use of these languages even though many students spoke little to no English or French. Some survivors reported being strapped or forced to eat soap when they were caught speaking their own language. The inability to communicate was further affected by their families' inabilities to speak English or French. Upon leaving residential school some survivors felt ashamed of being Indigenous as they were made to view their traditional identities as ugly and dirty. Survivors also have to deal with the effects of cultural linguicide, which is defined as loss of language which eventually leads to loss of culture.

The stigma the residential school system created against elders passing Indigenous culture on to younger generations has been linked to the over-representation of Indigenous languages on the list of endangered languages in Canada. The TRC noted that most of the 90 Indigenous languages that still exist are at risk of disappearing, with great-grandparents as the only speakers of many such languages. It concluded that a failure of governments and Indigenous communities to prioritize the teaching and preservation of traditional languages ensured that despite the closure of residential schools, the eradication of Indigenous culture desired by government officials and administrators would inevitably be fulfilled "through a process of systematic neglect". In addition to the forceful eradication of elements of Indigenous culture, the schools trained students in the patriarchal dichotomies then common in British and Canadian society and useful to state institutions, such as the domesticization of female students through imbuing 'stay-at-home' values and the militarization of male students through soldierlike regimentation.

However, Indigenous children in boarding schools were not deterred, and continued to speak and practice their language in an attempt to keep it alive. Assistant Professor in Professional Communication, Jane Griffith, said, "Predictably, nineteenth-century government texts do not reveal the strategies Indigenous peoples had for maintaining their languages in the same way Indian boarding school survivor memoir, literature, and testimony do from the twentieth and twenty-first centuries. This absence may exemplify how school newspapers carefully created an English-only fantasy for readers, but may also attest to the success of students' secrecy: perhaps official school documents did not report that students still knew Indigenous languages because schools were unaware of this. Government reports, if read contrapuntally, were more forthcoming in how students continued to speak their language, though they framed such resistance as failure."

The First Nations Information Governance Centre reports that 60.4% of residential school attendees could speak a First Nations language at a fluent or intermediate level, compared to 41% of those who did not attend and whose parents and grandparents did not attend. Among adults, 77.5% of residential school attendees participated in their community's cultural events "sometimes or always/almost always" whereas 62.5% of those not affected personally or intergenerationally did.

== Indigenous resistance ==
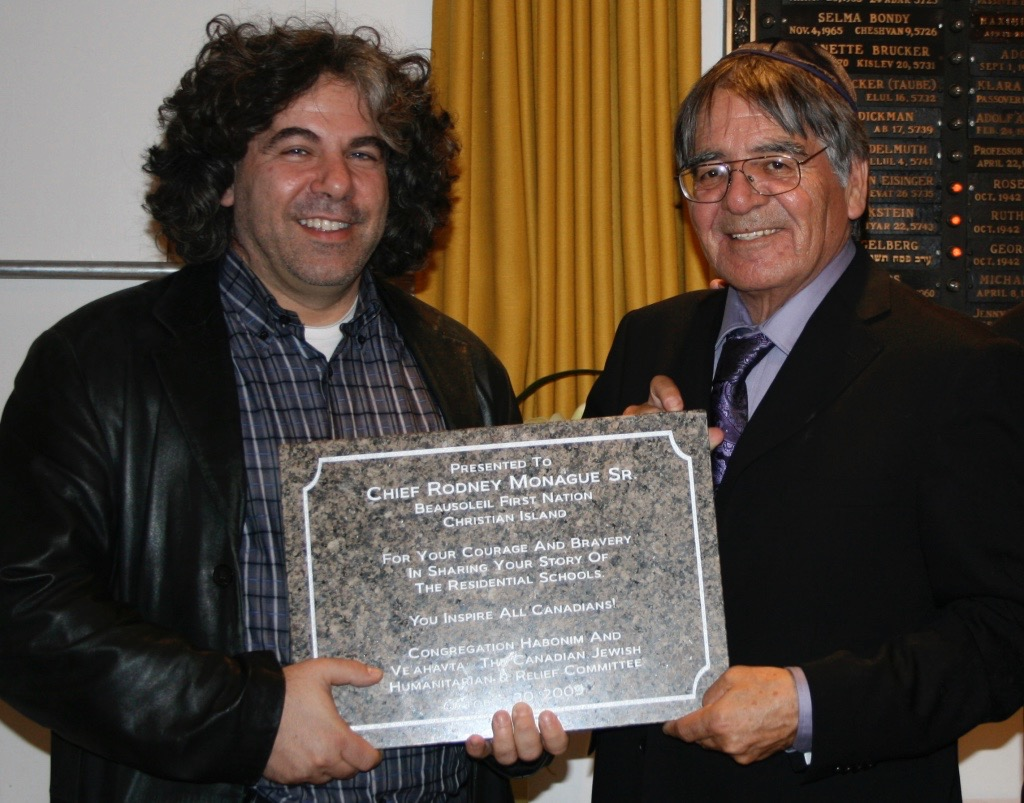
Chief Rodney Monague receives a plaque from Avrum Rosensweig, on behalf of the Canadian Jewish Humanitarian and Relief Committee, 2009

Boarding schools in Canada worked towards assimilation of Indigenous students. Historians Brian Klopotek and Brenda Child explain, "Education for Indians was not mandatory in Canada until 1920, long after compulsory attendance laws were passed in the United States, although families frequently resisted sending their children to the residential schools. Many protested the lack of decent educational opportunities available, but the government took little action until after World War I, when European-Canadians first began to acknowledge discriminatory treatment towards Indians." Indigenous resistance is defined, in the words of Anishinaabe scholar-artist Leanne Simpson as "a radical and complete overturning of the nation-state's political formations." During this time Indigenous peoples found ways to resist this colonial endeavor.

Those that survived used their knowledge to speak back against colonialism, as historians Brian Klopotek and Brenda Child explain, "in Canada, the results of this system were more complicated than the government anticipated. Often students returned to their reserves to become leaders, while others entered the labour market and competed with Euro-American workers." The Canadian government was displeased with this; as one minister for Indian Affairs noted in 1897, "we are educating these Indians to compete industrially with our own peoples, which seems to me a very undesirable amount of public money." The government, perceiving Indian education as too generous, reduced the services available to First Nations peoples beginning in 1910 and emphasized low cost schooling thereafter.

== Apologies ==
Acknowledgment of the wrongs done by the residential school system began in the 1980s.

=== Churches ===
==== United Church of Canada ====
In 1986, the first apology for residential schools by any institution in Canada was from the United Church of Canada in Sudbury, Ontario. At the 1986 31st General Council, the United Church of Canada responded to the request of Indigenous peoples that it apologize to them for its part in colonization and adopted the apology. Rev. Bob Smith stated:

We imposed our civilization as a condition of accepting the gospel. We tried to make you be like us and in so doing we helped to destroy the vision that made you what you were. As a result, you, and we, are poorer and the image of the Creator in us is twisted, blurred, and we are not what we are meant by God to be. We ask you to forgive us and to walk together with us in the Spirit of Christ so that our peoples may be blessed and God's creation healed.

The elders present at the General Council expressly refused to accept the apology and chose to receive the apology, believing further work needed to be done. In 1998, the church apologized expressly for the role it played in the residential school system. On behalf of The United Church of Canada the Right Rev. Bill Phipps stated:

I apologize for the pain and suffering that our church's involvement in the Indian Residential School system has caused. We are aware of some of the damage that this cruel and ill-conceived system of assimilation has perpetrated on Canada's First Nations peoples. For this we are truly and most humbly sorry... To those individuals who were physically, sexually, and mentally abused as students of the Indian Residential Schools in which The United Church of Canada was involved, I offer you our most sincere apology. You did nothing wrong. You were and are the victims of evil acts that cannot under any circumstances be justified or excused... We are in the midst of a long and painful journey as we reflect on the cries that we did not or would not hear, and how we have behaved as a church...we commit ourselves to work toward ensuring that we will never again use our power as a church to hurt others with attitudes of racial and spiritual superiority. We pray that you will hear the sincerity of our words today and that you will witness the living out of our apology in our actions in the future.

==== Catholic Church ====
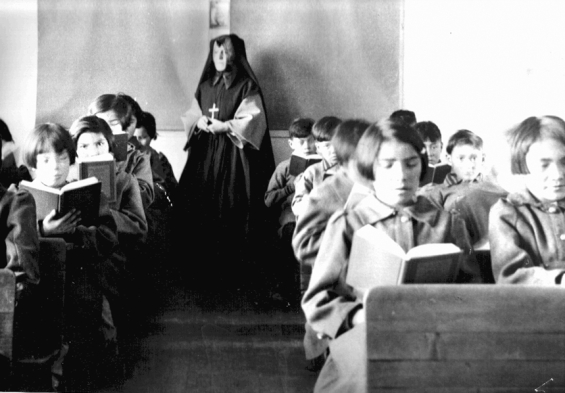
Students of St. Anne's Indian Residential School in Fort Albany, Ontario, c. 1945

In 1991, at the National Meeting on Indian Residential Schools in Saskatoon, Canadian bishops and leaders of religious orders that participated in the schools issued an apology stating:

We are sorry and deeply regret the pain, suffering and alienation that so many experienced. We have heard their cries of distress, feel their anguish and want to be part of the healing process ... we pledge solidarity with the aboriginal peoples in their pursuit of recognition of their basic human rights ... urge the federal government to assume its responsibility for its part in the Indian Residential Schools ... [and] urge our faith communities to become better informed and more involved in issues important to aboriginal peoples

In July 1991, Douglas Crosby, then presidential of the Oblate of Canada, the missionary religious congregation that operated a majority of the Catholic residential schools in Canada, apologized on behalf of 1,200 Oblates then living in Canada, to approximately 25,000 Indigenous people at Lac Ste. Anne, Alberta, stating:

We apologize for the part we played in the cultural, ethnical, linguistic and religious imperialism that was part of the European mentality and, in a particular way, for the instances of physical and sexual abuse that occurred in these schools ... For these trespasses we wish to voice today our deepest sorrow and we ask your forgiveness and understanding. We hope that we can make up for it being part of the healing process wherever necessary.

Crosby further pledged the need to "come again to that deep trust and solidarity that constitutes families. We recognize that the road beyond past hurt may be long and steep, but we pledge ourselves anew to journey with the Native Peoples on that road."

On May 16, 1993, in Idaho, Peter Hans Kolvenbach, then Superior General of the Society of Jesus, issued an apology for the actions of Jesuits in the Western missions and in the "ways the church was insensitive toward your tribal customs, language and spirituality ... The Society of Jesus is sorry for the mistakes it has made in the past".

In 2009, a delegation of 40 First Nations representatives from Canada and several Canadian bishops had a private meeting with Pope Benedict XVI to obtain an apology for abuses that occurred in the residential school system. Then leader of the Assembly of First Nations Grand Chief Phil Fontaine of the First Nations Summit in British Columbia, and Chief Edward John of Tlʼaztʼen Nation were in attendance. The Indigenous delegation were funded by Indian and Northern Affairs Canada. Afterwards, the Holy See released an official expression of sorrow on the church's role in residential schools and "the deplorable conduct of some members of the Church":

His Holiness [the Pope] emphasized that acts of abuse cannot be tolerated in society. He prayed that all those affected would experience healing, and he encouraged First Nations Peoples to continue to move forward with renewed hope.

Fontaine, a residential school survivor, later stated that he had sensed the pope's "pain and anguish" and that the acknowledgement was "important to [him] and that was what [he] was looking for". In an interview with CBC News, John stated in regards to the pope's acknowledgement of the suffering of the school survivors "I think in that sense, there was that apology that we were certainly looking for." Many argue that Pope Benedict XVI's statement was not a full apology. In the 2015 Report from the Truth and Reconciliation Commission of Canada (TRC), Action 58 called for the pope to issue an apology similar to Pope Benedict XVI's 2010 pastoral letter to Ireland issued from the Vatican, but be delivered by the Pope on Canadian soil.

On May 29, 2017, Prime Minister Justin Trudeau asked Pope Francis for a public apology to all survivors of the residential school system, rather than the expression of sorrow issued by Pope Benedict XVI in 2009. Trudeau invited the pope to issue the apology in Canada. Although no commitment for such an apology followed the meeting, he noted that the pope pointed to a lifelong commitment of supporting marginalized people and an interest in working collaboratively with Trudeau and Canadian bishops to establish a way forward.

On June 10, 2021, a delegation of Indigenous people were announced to meet with the pope later in the year to discuss the legacy of residential schools. On 29 June, the delegation was scheduled to take place from December 17 to 20, 2021, to comply with COVID-19 global travel restrictions. Archbishop Richard Gagnon, president of the Canadian Conference of Catholic Bishops spoke on the topic, stating "What the Pope said and did in Bolivia is what he will do in Canada."

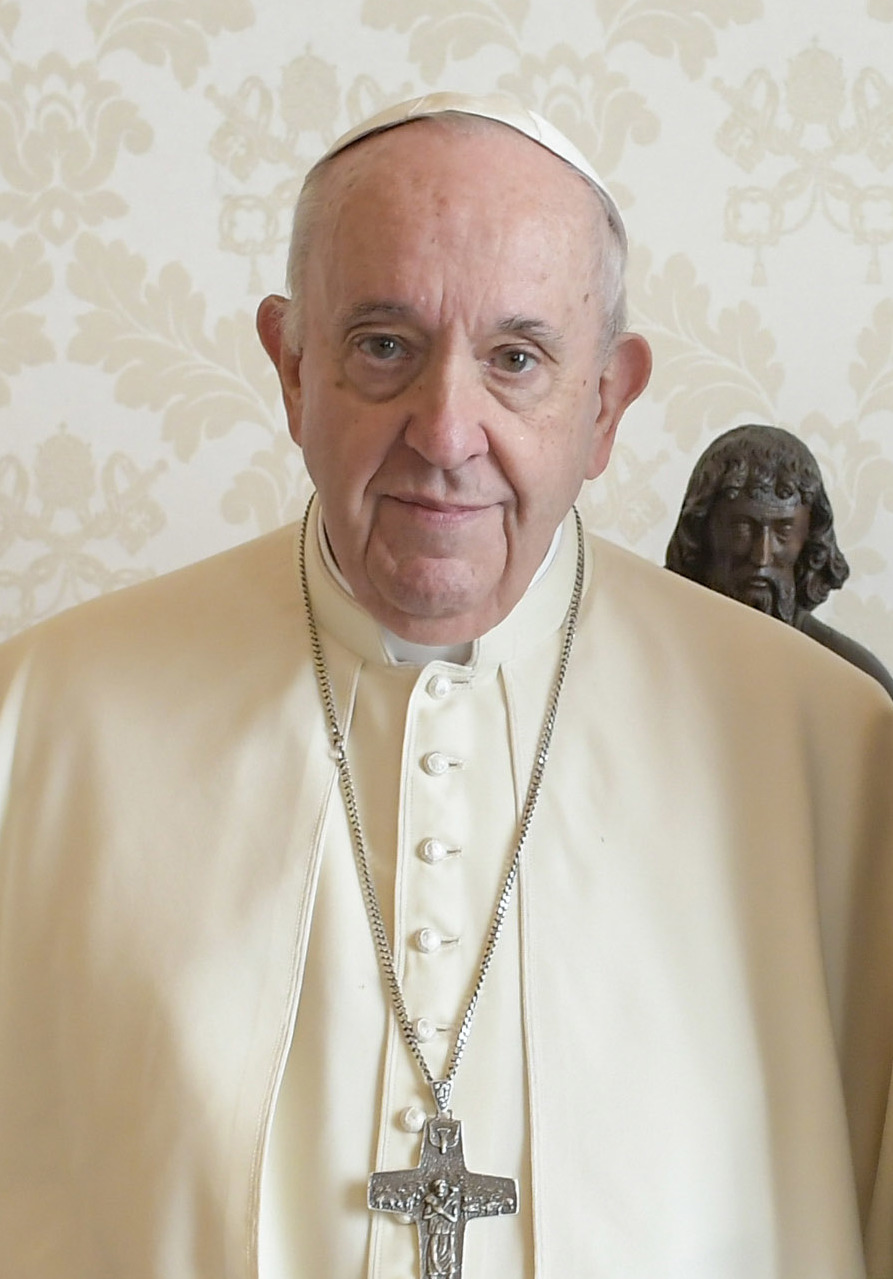
Pope Francis

On September 24, 2021, the Canadian Conference of Catholic Bishops issued a formal apology for residential schools stating "We, the Catholic Bishops of Canada, gathered in Plenary this week, take this opportunity to affirm to you, the Indigenous Peoples of this land, that we acknowledge the suffering experienced in Canada's Indian Residential Schools. Many Catholic religious communities and dioceses participated in this system, which led to the suppression of Indigenous languages, culture and spirituality, failing to respect the rich history, traditions and wisdom of Indigenous Peoples. We acknowledge the grave abuses that were committed by some members of our Catholic community; physical, psychological, emotional, spiritual, cultural, and sexual." Assembly of First Nations Chief RoseAnne Archibald stated she felt conflicted, saying "On one hand, their unequivocal apology is welcomed," but that she was disappointed that the bishops had not issued a formal request for the pope to visit Canada in person. The Catholic bishops also stated

We are fully committed to the process of healing and reconciliation. Together with the many pastoral initiatives already underway in dioceses across the country, and as a further tangible expression of this ongoing commitment, we are pledging to undertake fundraising in each region of the country to support initiatives discerned locally with Indigenous partners. Furthermore, we invite the Indigenous Peoples to journey with us into a new era of reconciliation, helping us in each of our dioceses across the country to prioritize initiatives of healing, to listen to the experience of Indigenous Peoples, especially to the survivors of Indian Residential Schools, and to educate our clergy, consecrated men and women, and lay faithful, on Indigenous cultures and spirituality. We commit ourselves to continue the work of providing documentation or records that will assist in the memorialization of those buried in unmarked graves.

The bishops also stated "Pope Francis will encounter and listen to the Indigenous participants, so as to discern how he can support our common desire to renew relationships and walk together along the path of hope in the coming years" with some interpreting this visit as an important step that could lead to a formal visit to Canada by the pope.

On April 1, 2022, during a meeting between a delegation of First Nations representatives and the pope at the Vatican, Pope Francis apologized for the conduct of some members of the Catholic Church in the Canadian Indian residential school system. Pope Francis said:

I also feel shame ... sorrow and shame for the role that a number of Catholics, particularly those with educational responsibilities, have had in all these things that wounded you, and the abuses you suffered and the lack of respect shown for your identity, your culture and even your spiritual values. For the deplorable conduct of these members of the Catholic Church, I ask for God's forgiveness and I want to say to you with all my heart, I am very sorry. And I join my brothers, the Canadian bishops, in asking your pardon.

During a July 2022 penitential pilgrimage to western Canada, Pope Francis reiterated the apologies of the Catholic Church, with hundreds of Indigenous people and government officials in attendance, for its members' role in administrating many of the residential schools on behalf of the government and for abuse that occurred at the hand of Catholic priests and religious sisters. At the Pope's apologetic address given at Maskwacis, Chief Wilton Littlechild expressed hope for the future, saying: "You [Pope Francis] have said that you come as a pilgrim, seeking to walk together with us on the pathway of truth, justice, healing, reconciliation, and hope. We gladly welcome you to join us on this journey ... we sincerely hope that our encounter this morning, and the words you share with us, will echo with true healing and real hope throughout many generations to come." Murray Sinclair, the former chair of the Truth and Reconciliation Commission, found the apology "insultingly insufficient". J.J. McCullough, writing in The Washington Post, stated, "it was common to complain that the Pope's apology was not an institutional apology from the Church as a whole."

==== Anglican ====
I accept and I confess before God and you, our failures in the residential schools. We failed you. We failed ourselves. We failed God.

I am sorry, more than I can say, that we were part of a system which took you and your children from home and family.

I am sorry, more than I can say, that we tried to remake you in our image, taking from you your language and the signs of your identity.

I am sorry, more than I can say, that in our schools so many were abused physically, sexually, culturally and emotionally.

On behalf of the Anglican Church of Canada, I present our apology.

— Archbishop Michael Peers, A Step Along the Path

On August 6, 1993, at the National Native Convocation in Minaki, Ontario. Archbishop Michael Peers apologized to former residential school students on behalf of the Anglican Church of Canada. Almost 30 years later, in April to May, 2022, Justin Welby, the Archbishop of Canterbury, the senior bishop and a principal leader of the Church of England and the ceremonial head of the worldwide Anglican Communion, undertook a five-day visit to Canada, during which he apologized for the "terrible crime" he said the Anglican Church committed in running residential schools and for the Church of England's "grievous sins" against the Indigenous peoples of Canada. He continued, "I am so sorry that the Church participated in the attempt—the failed attempt, because you rose above it and conquered it—to dehumanise and abuse those we should have embraced as brothers and sisters." The Archbishop spent time visiting reserves, meeting with First Nations leaders and Anglicans, and listening to former residential school students.

==== Presbyterian ====
On June 9, 1994, the Presbyterian Church in Canada adopted a confession at its 120th General Assembly in Toronto on June 5, recognizing its role in residential schools and seeking forgiveness. The confession was presented on October 8 during a ceremony in Winnipeg.

We ask, also, for forgiveness from Aboriginal peoples. What we have heard we acknowledge. It is our hope that those whom we have wronged with a hurt too deep for telling will accept what we have to say. With God's guidance our Church will seek opportunities to walk with Aboriginal peoples to find healing and wholeness together as God's people.

=== Canadian government ===
==== Royal Canadian Mounted Police ====
In 2004, immediately before signing the first Public Safety Protocol with the Assembly of First Nations, Royal Canadian Mounted Police (RCMP) Commissioner Giuliano Zaccardelli issued an apology on behalf of the RCMP for its role in the Indian residential school system: "We, I, as Commissioner of the RCMP, am truly sorry for what role we played in the residential school system and the abuse that took place in the residential system."

==== Federal Cabinet ====
After the Indian Residential Schools Settlement Agreement was accepted by Prime Minister Paul Martin's ministry in 2005, activists called for Martin's successor, Prime Minister Stephen Harper, to apologize. The Cabinet headed by Harper refused, stating an apology was not part of the agreement. On May 1, 2007, Member of Parliament Gary Merasty, of the Peter Ballantyne Cree Nation, introduced a motion for an apology, which passed unanimously.

On June 11, 2008, Harper issued an apology on behalf of the sitting Cabinet for past ministries' policies of assimilation. He did this in front of an audience of Indigenous delegates and in an address that was broadcast nationally on the CBC. The Prime Minister apologized not only for the known excesses of the residential school system, but for the creation of the system itself. Harper delivered the speech in the House of Commons; the procedural device of a committee of the whole was used so that Indigenous leaders, who were not members of parliament, could be allowed to respond to the apology on the floor of the house.

Harper's apology excluded Newfoundland and Labrador on the basis that the 28th Canadian Ministry should not be held accountable for pre-Confederation actions. Residential schools in Newfoundland and Labrador were located in St Anthony, Cartwright, North West River, Nain, and Makkovik. These schools were run by the International Grenfell Association and the German Moravian Missionaries. The government argued that because these schools were not created under the auspices of the Indian Act, they were not true residential schools. More than 1,000 former students disagreed and filed a class action lawsuit against the government for compensation in 2007. By the time the suit was settled in 2016, almost a decade later, dozens of plaintiffs had died. Lawyers expected that up to 900 former students would be compensated.

Prime Minister Justin Trudeau delivered an apology to Innu, Inuit, and NunatuKavut former students and their families in Happy Valley-Goose Bay, Labrador. He acknowledged that students experienced multiple forms of abuse linking their treatment to the colonial thinking that shaped the school system. Trudeau's apology was received on behalf of residential school survivors by Toby Obed, who framed the apology as a key part of the healing process that connected survivors from Newfoundland and Labrador with school attendees from across the country. Members of the Innu nation were less receptive, rejecting the apology ahead of the ceremony. Grand Chief Gregory Rich noted in a released statement that he was "not satisfied that Canada understands yet what it has done to Innu and what it is still doing", indicating that members felt they deserved an apology for more than their experiences at residential schools.

==== Provincial ====
Then-Manitoba Premier Greg Selinger became, on June 18, 2015, the first politician to issue an apology for past cabinets' role in the Sixties Scoop. Class action lawsuits have been brought against the Saskatchewan, Manitoba, and Ontario governments for the harm caused to victims of the large-scale adoption scheme that saw thousands of Indigenous children forcibly removed from their parents in the 1960s. Indigenous leaders responded by insisting that while apologies were welcomed, action—including a federal apology, reunification of families, compensation, and counselling for victims—must accompany words for them to have real meaning.

The Premier of Alberta at the time, Rachel Notley, issued an apology as a ministerial statement on June 22, 2015, in a bid to begin to address the wrongs done by the province's previous ministries to the Indigenous peoples of Alberta and the rest of Canada. At the same time, Notley called on the federal government to hold an inquiry on the missing and murdered Indigenous women in Canada. The Premier also stated her intent for the government to build relationships with provincial leaders of Indigenous communities and sought to amend the provincial curriculum to include the history of Indigenous culture.

In the Legislative Assembly of Ontario, on May 30, 2016, the serving Premier of Ontario, Kathleen Wynne, apologized on behalf of the Executive Council for the harm done at residential schools. Affirming Ontario's commitment to reconciliation with Indigenous peoples, she acknowledged the school system as "one of the most shameful chapters in Canadian history". In a 105-minute ceremony, Wynne announced that the Ontario government would spend $250 million on education initiatives and would also rename the Ministry of Aboriginal Affairs the Ministry of Indigenous Relations and Reconciliation. It was further announced that the first week of November would be known as Treaties Recognition Week.

==== Calls for the monarch to apologize ====
The Manitoba Keewatinook Ininew Okimowin Tribal Council, representing 30 northern Manitoba Indigenous communities, requested on February 21, 2008, that Queen Elizabeth II apologize for the residential schools in Canada. Grand Chief of the council Sydney Garrioch sent a letter with this request to Buckingham Palace.

In Winnipeg, on Canada Day, July 1, 2021, the statue of Queen Victoria in front of the Manitoba Legislative Building, and that of Queen Elizabeth II in the garden of nearby Government House, were vandalized and toppled; the head of the Queen Victoria statue was removed and thrown into the Assiniboine River. Following this event, associate professor of sociology at the University of Winnipeg Kimberley Ducey called for Queen Elizabeth II to apologize for the role of the British monarchy in the establishment of residential schools, though sovereigns since George III have had their powers constrained by the tenets of constitutional monarchy and responsible government, meaning they had no direct responsibility in residential school policy.

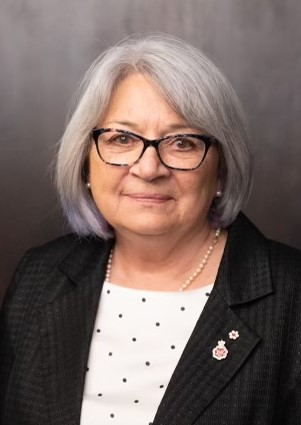
Governor General Mary Simon, who is Inuk, is the first Indigenous person to be appointed to the viceregal post.

On Canada's first National Day for Truth and Reconciliation, on September 30, 2021, Elizabeth, as Queen of Canada, said she "joins with all Canadians ... to reflect on the painful history that Indigenous peoples endured in residential schools in Canada and on the work that remains to heal and to continue to build an inclusive society". The same year, the Queen appointed Mary Simon to represent her as governor general; Simon is the first Indigenous person to occupy the office. The Queen and Simon met in March 2022, after which the vicereine said to the Canadian Broadcasting Corporation, "we talked about reconciliation and I did talk about the need for healing in our country and to have a better understanding and a better relationship between Indigenous people and other Canadians" and she felt the Queen was well informed on issues affecting Canada.

In his first speech of his royal tour in 2022, Prince Charles, Prince of Wales (Elizabeth II's eldest son and then-heir to the Canadian Crown), said that it was an "important moment, with "Indigenous and non-Indigenous peoples across Canada committing to reflect honestly and openly on the past, and to forge a new relationship for the future". The Prince and his wife, Camilla, Duchess of Cornwall, participated in moments of reflection and prayer, first with Lieutenant Governor of Newfoundland and Labrador Judy Foote and Indigenous leaders at Heart Garden—which had been opened on the grounds of the provincial Government House in 2019, in memory of former residential school students—and, two days later, at the Ceremonial Circle in the Dene community of Dettah, Northwest Territories, where they also participated in an opening prayer, a drumming circle, and a feeding the fire ceremony. Elisabeth Penashue, an elder of the Sheshatshiu Innu First Nation in Labrador, said it was "really important they hear our stories".

At a reception hosted by the Governor General at Rideau Hall, in Ottawa, RoseAnne Archibald, National Chief of the Assembly of First Nations, appealed directly to the Prince for an apology from the Queen in her capacity as monarch and head of the Church of England for the wrongful acts committed in the past by the Crown and the church in relation to Indigenous peoples. (The Archbishop of Canterbury had, though, already apologized on behalf of the Church of England in April of that year.) Archibald said that the Prince "acknowledged" failures by Canadian governments in handling the relationship between the Crown and Indigenous people, which she said "really meant something". Royal correspondent Sarah Campbell noted, "on this brief tour, there has been no shying away from acknowledging and highlighting the scandalous way many indigenous peoples have been treated in Canada."

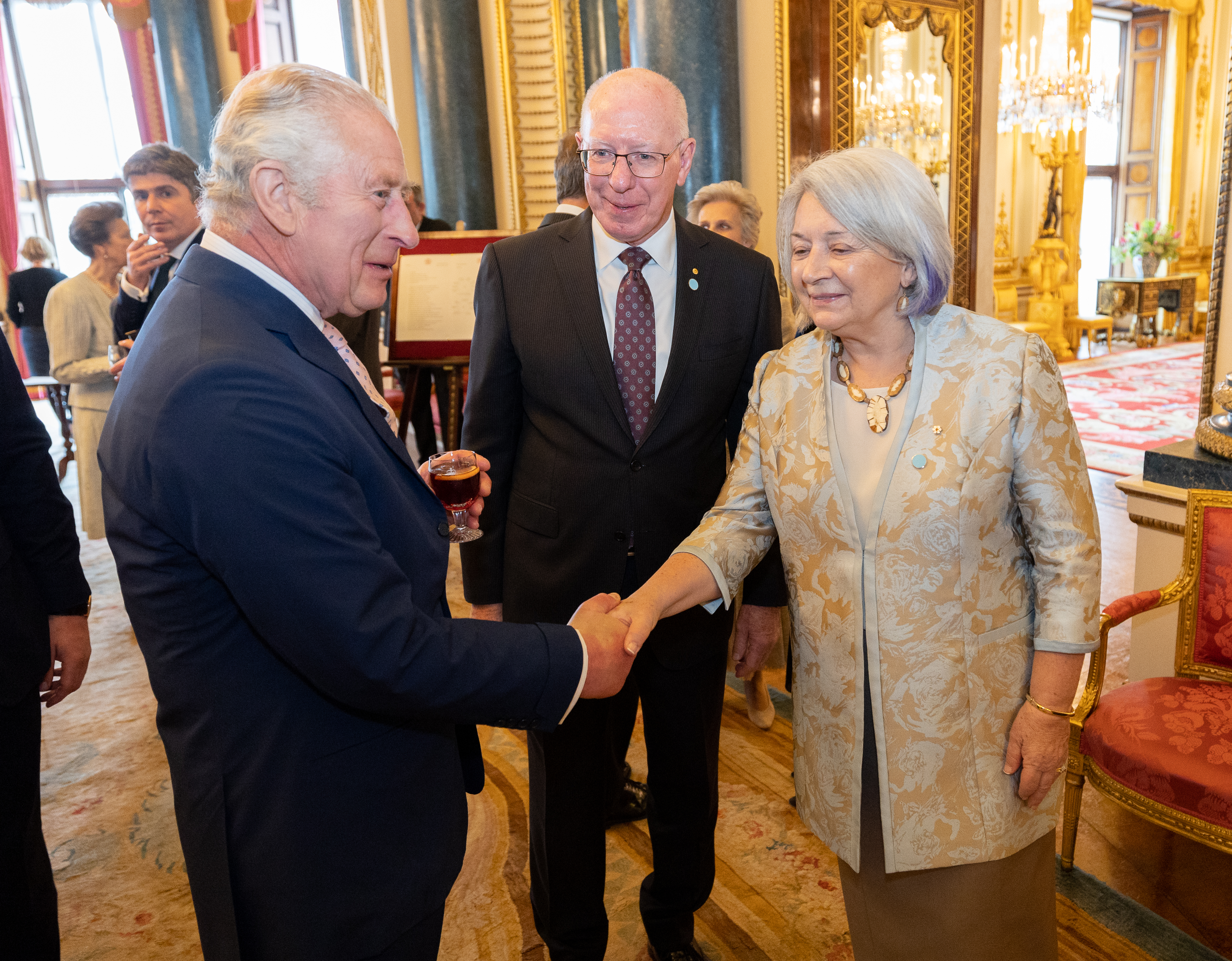
At a reception at Buckingham Palace, on the day before his coronation, 5 May 2023, King Charles III (left, foreground) meets with Governor General Mary Simon (right), who is the first Indigenous person to be appointed to the viceregal post.

Queen Elizabeth II died on September 8, 2022, upon which Charles acceded to the Canadian throne. Two days before Charles' coronation on May 6, 2023, Simon organized a meeting between herself, the King, Archibald, President of the Métis National Council Cassidy Caron, and Inuit Tapiriit Kanatami President Natan Obed, all of whom also attended the coronation. Afterward, Caron recounted that she raised the issue of recognition for Métis residential school survivors, who were not included in the Indian Residential School Settlement Agreement and were not given an apology from the prime minister. Archibald said she remained hopeful the King would apologize for colonization and the Church of England's role in the residential school system. Simon told CTV News she was not certain there would be an apology and that she put more value in action, elaborating, "an apology is words, and it makes people feel good and deal with their trauma to some extent. But, if you don't have any action after that, it stays static".

=== Universities ===
On October 27, 2011, University of Manitoba president David Barnard apologized to the TRC for the institution's role in educating people who operated the residential school system. The Winnipeg Free Press believed it to be the first time a Canadian university has apologized for playing a role in residential schools.

On April 9, 2018, the University of British Columbia (UBC) opened the Indian Residential School History and Dialogue Centre as a West Coast complement to the National Centre for Truth and Reconciliation in Winnipeg. At the opening, UBC President Santa Ono apologized to residential school victims and dignitaries including Grand Chief Edward John and Canadian Justice Minister Jody Wilson-Raybould. Ono apologized for UBC's training of policymakers and administrators who operated the system and stated:

On behalf of the university and all its people, I apologize to all of you who are survivors of the residential schools, to your families and communities and to all Indigenous people for the role this university played in perpetuating that system...We apologize for the actions and inaction of our predecessors and renew our commitment to working with all of you for a more just and equitable future.

== Reconciliation ==
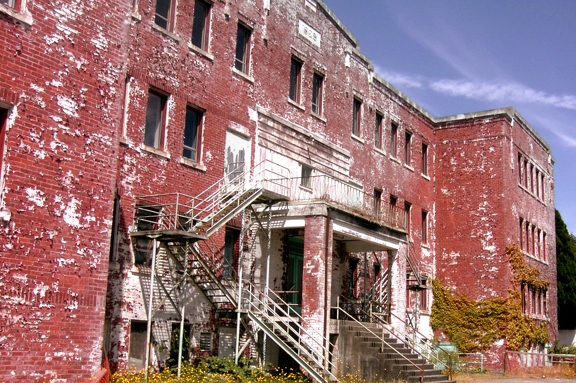
Former St. Michael's Residential School in Alert Bay, British Columbia. Formerly standing on the traditional territory of the ‘Namgis First Nation, it was demolished in February 2015.

In the summer of 1990, the Mohawks of Kanesatake confronted the government about its failure to honour Indigenous land claims and recognize traditional Mohawk territory in Oka, Quebec. Referred to by media outlets as the Oka Crisis, the land dispute sparked a critical discussion about the Canadian government's complacency regarding relations with Indigenous communities and responses to their concerns. The action prompted then Prime Minister Brian Mulroney to underscore four government responsibilities: "resolving land claims; improving the economic and social conditions on reserves; defining a new relationship between aboriginal peoples and governments; and addressing the concerns of Canada's aboriginal peoples in contemporary Canadian life." The actions of the Mohawk community members led to, in part, along with objections from Indigenous leaders regarding the Meech Lake Accord, the creation of the Royal Commission on Aboriginal Peoples to examine the status of Indigenous peoples in Canada. In 1996, the Royal Commission presented a final report which first included a vision for meaningful and action-based reconciliation.

=== Ecclesiastical projects ===
In 1975, the Anglican, Catholic and United Churches, along with six other churches, formed Project North, later known as the Aboriginal Rights Coalition (ARC), with the objective of "transformation of the relationship between Canadian society and Aboriginal peoples." The campaign's objectives were:

- "The recognition of Aboriginal land and treaty rights in Canada;
- Realizing the historic rights of Aboriginal peoples as they are recognized in the Canadian constitution and upheld in the courts, including the right to self-determination
- Reversing the erosion of social rights, including rights to adequate housing, education, health care and appropriate legal systems;
- Seeking reconciliation between Aboriginal peoples, the Christian community and Canadian society;
- Clarifying the moral and spiritual basis for action towards Aboriginal and social justice in Canada;
- Opposing development and military projects that threaten Aboriginal communities and the environment; and
- Promoting Aboriginal justice within Jubilee."

The churches have also engaged in reconciliation initiatives such as the Returning to Spirit: Residential School Healing and Reconciliation Program, a workshop that aims to unite Indigenous and non-Indigenous people through discussing the legacy of residential schools and fostering an environment for them to communicate and develop mutual understanding. In 2014, the federal government ceased to contribute funds to Indigenous health organizations such as the AHF and the National Aboriginal Health Organization. Since then, more pressure has been placed on churches to sustain their active participation in these healing efforts.

In 1992, The Anglican Church of Canada set up the Anglican Healing Fund for Healing and Reconciliation to respond to the ongoing need for healing related to residential schools. From 1992 to 2007, the fund funded over $8 million towards 705 projects.

In October 1997, the Canadian Conference of Catholic Bishops (CCCB) agreed on the establishment of the Council for Reconciliation, Solidarity and Communion for the following year. In 2007, the council became the Catholic Aboriginal Council. On November 30, 1999, the CCCB signed an agreement with the Assembly of First Nations, represented by Grand Chief Phil Fontaine.

In the 2000s the United Church established the Justice and Reconciliation Fund to support healing initiatives and the Presbyterian Church has established a Healing & Reconciliation Program.

=== Financial compensation ===
In January 1998, the government made a "statement of reconciliation" – including an apology to those people who were sexually or physically abused while attending residential schools – and established the Aboriginal Healing Foundation (AHF). The foundation was provided with $350 million to fund community-based healing projects addressing the legacy of physical and sexual abuse. In its 2005 budget, the Canadian government committed an additional $40 million to support the work of the AHF. Federal funding for the foundation was cut in 2010 by the Stephen Harper government, leaving 134 national healing-related initiatives without an operating budget. The AHF closed in 2014. Former AHF executive director Mike DeGagne has said that the loss of AHF support has created a gap in dealing with mental health crises such as suicides in the Attawapiskat First Nation.

In June 2001, the government established Indian Residential Schools Resolution Canada as an independent government department to manage the residential school file. In 2003, the Alternative Dispute Resolution (ADR) process was launched as part of a larger National Resolution Framework which included health supports, a commemoration component and a strategy for litigation. As explained by the TRC, the ADR was designed as a "voluntary process for resolution of certain claims of sexual abuse, physical abuse, and forcible confinement, without having to go through the civil litigation process". It was created by the Canadian government without consultation with Indigenous communities or former residential school students. The ADR system also made it the responsibility of the former students to prove that the abuse occurred and was intentional, resulting in former students finding the system difficult to navigate, re-traumatizing, and discriminatory. Many survivor advocacy groups and Indigenous political organizations such as the Assembly of First Nations (AFN) worked to have the ADR system dissolved. In 2004 the Assembly of First Nations released a report critical of the ADR underscoring, among other issues, the failure of survivors to automatically receive the full amount of compensation without subsequent ligation against the church and failure to compensate for lost family, language and culture. The Canadian House of Commons Standing Committee on Aboriginal Affairs and Northern Development released its own report in April 2005 finding the ADR to be "an excessively costly and inappropriately applied failure, for which the Minister and her officials are unable to raise a convincing defence". Within a month of the report's release a Supreme Court of Canada decision granted school attendees the right to pursue class-action suits, which ultimately led to a government review of the compensation process.

On November 23, 2005, the Canadian government announced a $1.9-billion compensation package to benefit tens of thousands of former students. National Chief of the AFN, Phil Fontaine, said the package was meant to cover "decades in time, innumerable events and countless injuries to First Nations individuals and communities". Justice Minister Irwin Cotler applauded the compensation decision noting that the placement of children in the residential school system was "the single most harmful, disgraceful and racist act in our history". At an Ottawa news conference, Deputy Prime Minister Anne McLellan said: "We have made good on our shared resolve to deliver what I firmly believe will be a fair and lasting resolution of the Indian school legacy."

The compensation package led to the Indian Residential Schools Settlement Agreement (IRSSA), announced on May 8, 2006, and implemented in September 2007. At the time, there were about 86,000 living victims. The IRSSA included funding for the AHF, for commemoration, for health support, and for a Truth and Reconciliation program, as well as an individual Common Experience Payment (CEP). Any person who could be verified as having resided at a federally run Indian residential school in Canada was entitled to a CEP. The amount of compensation was based on the number of years a particular former student resided at the residential schools: $10,000 for the first year attended (from one night residing there to a full school year) plus $3,000 for every year thereafter.

The IRSSA also included the Independent Assessment Process (IAP), a case-by-case, out-of-court resolution process designed to provide compensation for sexual, physical and emotional abuse. The IAP process was built on the ADR program and all IAP claims from former students are examined by an adjudicator. The IAP became available to all former students of residential schools on September 19, 2007. Former students who experienced abuse and wished to pursue compensation had to apply by themselves or through a lawyer of their choice to receive consideration. The deadline to apply for the IAP was September 19, 2012. This gave former students of residential schools four years from the implementation date of the IRSSA to apply for the IAP. Claims involving physical and sexual abuse were compensated up to $275,000. By September 30, 2016, the IAP had resolved 36,538 claims and paid $3.1 billion in compensation.

The IRSSA also proposed an advance payment for former students alive and who were 65 years old and over as of May 30, 2005. The deadline for reception of the advance payment form by IRSRC was December 31, 2006. Following a legal process, including an examination of the IRSSA by the courts of the provinces and territories of Canada, an "opt-out" period occurred. During this time, the former students of residential schools could reject the agreement if they did not agree with its dispositions. This opt-out period ended on August 20, 2007, with about 350 former students opting out. The IRSSA was the largest class action settlement in Canadian history. By December 2012, a total of $1.62 billion was paid to 78,750 former students, 98 per cent of the 80,000 who were eligible. In 2014, the IRSSA funds left over from CEPs were offered for educational credits for survivors and their families.

=== Truth and Reconciliation Commission ===
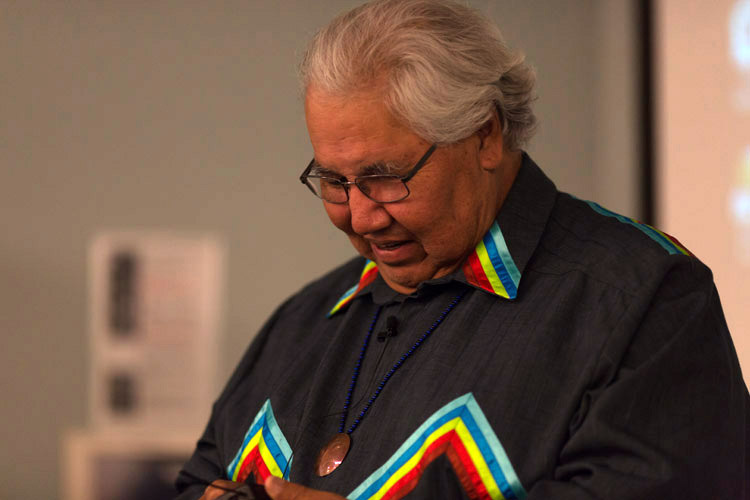
Justice Murray Sinclair at the 2015 Shingwauk Gathering and Conference at Algoma University

In 2008, the Truth and Reconciliation Commission (TRC) was established to travel across Canada collecting the testimonies of people affected by the residential school system. About 7,000 Indigenous people told their stories. The TRC concluded in 2015 with the publication of a six volume, 4,000-plus-page report detailing the testimonies of survivors and historical documents from the time. It resulted in the establishment of the National Centre for Truth and Reconciliation.

The executive summary of the TRC concluded that the assimilation amounted to cultural genocide. The ambiguity of the phrasing allowed for the interpretation that physical and biological genocide also occurred. The TRC was not authorized to conclude that physical and biological genocide occurred, as such a finding would imply a legal responsibility of the Canadian government that would be difficult to prove. As a result, the debate about whether the Canadian government also committed physical and biological genocide against Indigenous populations remains open.

Among the 94 Calls to Action that accompanied the conclusion of the TRC were recommendations to ensure that all Canadians are educated and made aware of the residential school system. Justice Murray Sinclair explained that the recommendations were not aimed solely at prompting government action, but instead a collective move toward reconciliation in which all Canadians have a role to play: "Many of our elements, many of our recommendations and many of the Calls to Action are actually aimed at Canadian society."

Preservation of documentation of the legacy of residential schools was also highlighted as part of the TRC's Calls to Action. Community groups and other stakeholders have variously argued for documenting or destroying evidence and testimony of residential school abuses. On April 4, 2016, the Court of Appeal for Ontario ruled that documents pertaining to IAP settlements will be destroyed in 15 years if individual claimants do not request to have their documents archived. This decision was fought by the TRC as well as the federal government, but argued for by religious representatives.

In March 2017, Lynn Beyak, a Conservative member of the Senate Standing Committee of Aboriginal Peoples, voiced disapproval of the final TRC report, saying that it had omitted the positives of the schools. Although Beyak's right to free speech was defended by some Conservative senators, her comments were widely criticized by members of the opposition, among them Minister of Indigenous and Northern Affairs, Carolyn Bennett, and leader of the New Democratic Party, Tom Mulcair. The Anglican Church also raised concerns stating in a release co-signed by bishops Fred Hiltz and Mark MacDonald: "There was nothing good about children going missing and no report being filed. There was nothing good about burying children in unmarked graves far from their ancestral homes." In response, the Conservative Party leadership removed Beyak from the Senate committee underscoring that her comments did not align with the views of the party.

=== Educational initiatives ===
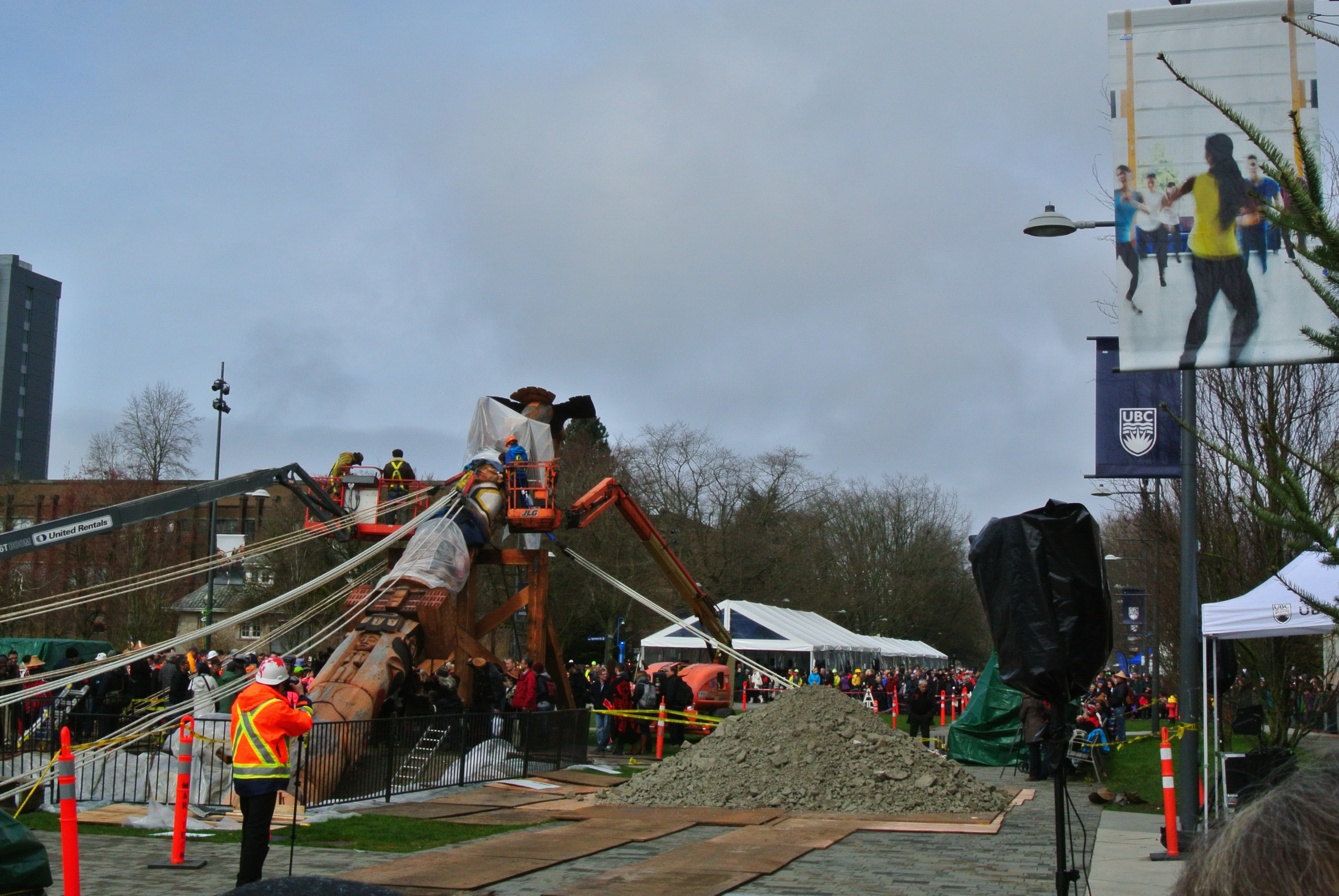
Raising of the Reconciliation Pole on UBC Vancouver campus

Education or awareness of the residential school system or its abuses is low among Canadians. A 2020 survey suggested that nearly half of Canadians never learned about the residential schools when they were students, with 34% of those who were taught by teachers being provided a positive assessment. Another poll conducted in 2021 showed that only 10% of Canadians were very familiar with the history of the residential school system and that 68% say they were unaware of the severity of abuses or completely shocked by it, and that so many children could die. A majority of Canadians believe that educational provincial curricula does not include enough about residential schools, that the education level should increase, and that the framing of the residential school system has been downplayed in the education system.

For many communities the buildings that formerly housed residential schools are a traumatic reminder of the system's legacy; demolition, heritage status and the possibility of incorporating sites into the healing process have been discussed. In July 2016, it was announced that the building of the former Mohawk Institute Residential School would be converted into an educational centre with exhibits on the legacy of residential schools. Ontario's Minister of Indigenous Relations and Reconciliation, David Zimmer, noted: "Its presence will always be a reminder of colonization and the racism of the residential school system; one of the darkest chapters of Canadian history."

Reconciliation efforts have also been undertaken by several Canadian universities. In 2015 Lakehead University and the University of Winnipeg introduced a mandatory course requirement for all undergraduate students focused on Indigenous culture and history. The same year the University of Saskatchewan hosted a two-day national forum at which Canadian university administrators, scholars and members of Indigenous communities discussed how Canadian universities can and should respond to the TRC's Calls to Action.

On April 1, 2017, a 17-metre (56 ft) pole, titled "Reconciliation Pole", was raised on the grounds of the University of British Columbia (UBC) Vancouver campus. Carved by Haida master carver and hereditary chief, 7idansuu (/ʔiː.dæn.suː/) (Edenshaw), James Hart, the pole tells the story of the residential school system prior to, during and after its operation. It features thousands of copper nails, used to represent the children who died in Canadian residential schools, and depictions of residential school survivors carved by artists from multiple Indigenous communities, including Canadian Inuk director Zacharias Kunuk, Maliseet artist Shane Perley-Dutcher, and Muqueam Coast Salish artist Susan Point.

In October 2016, Canadian singer-songwriter Gord Downie released Secret Path, a concept album about Chanie Wenjack's escape and death. It was accompanied by a graphic novel and animated film, aired on CBC Television. Proceeds went to the University of Manitoba's Centre for Truth and Reconciliation. Following his death in October 2017, Downie's brother Mike said he was aware of 40,000 teachers who had used the material in their classrooms, and hoped to continue this. In December 2017, Downie was posthumously named Canadian Newsmaker of the Year by the Canadian Press, in part because of his work with reconciliation efforts for survivors of residential schools.

=== National Day for Truth and Reconciliation ===
The Truth and Reconciliation Commission's 80th call to action was for the government to designate a National Day for Truth and Reconciliation that would become a statutory holiday to honour the survivors, their families, and communities. In August 2018, the government announced it was considering three possible dates as the new national holiday. After consultation, Orange Shirt Day was selected as the holiday.

Orange Shirt Day pre-existed the government's efforts to make it a holiday. The day started in 2013, when at a residential school reunion, survivor Phyllis Jack Webstad told her story. She recounted how her grandmother bought her a new orange shirt to go to school in, and when she arrived at the residential school, the shirt was stripped away from her and never returned. The other survivors founded the SJM Project, and on September 30, 2013—the time of the year when Indigenous children were taken away to residential schools—they encouraged students in schools in the area to wear an orange shirt in memory of the victims of the residential school system. The observance of the holiday spread quickly across Canada, and in 2017 the Canadian government encouraged all Canadians to participate in the observance of Orange Shirt Day.

On March 21, 2019, Georgina Jolibois submitted a private member's bill to call for Orange Shirt Day to become a statutory holiday; the bill passed the House of Commons, but the next election was called before the bill could pass the Senate and become law. After the election, Steven Guilbeault reintroduced the bill to make Orange Shirt Day a national statutory holiday. Following the discovery of 215 unmarked anomalies on the grounds of the former Kamloops Indian Residential School on May 24, 2021, Parliament agreed to pass the bill unanimously, and the bill received royal assent on June 3, 2021.

During the 2022 National Day for Truth and Reconciliation, the Peace Tower on Parliament Hill, as well as buildings across Canada, were illuminated to honour those affected by the Canadian residential school system. They were lit up in orange throughout the evening of September 30, 2022, from 7:00pm until sunrise.

== Denialism ==
External videos
- "Mythbusting Residential Schools were well-intentioned" (2024) – Sean Carleton - University of Manitoba (2:43 min)

Residential school denialism is negationist ideology that trivializes, downplays, or misrepresents the effects of the Canadian Indian residential school system. Despite decades of recognition and acknowledgments, denialist claims remain a factor within Canadian society. Residential school denialism often includes claims that the number of reported deaths has been inflated by the "reconciliation industry", that there were only isolated cases of child sexual abuse, and that many survivors are untrustworthy or are merely seeking compensation.

Denialism is a perspective maintained by a small group of academics, researchers, and publications that contend the school system was a well-intentioned "civilizing mission", a progressive form of state intervention that provided education and benefited students. Denialism is often presented in a pseudo-scholarly manner. Organizations such as the "Indian Residential Schools Research Group" (IRSRG) have been created to "cast doubt on the residential schools' harmful legacy".

A period of redress began with the formation of the Truth and Reconciliation Commission of Canada by the Government of Canada on June 1, 2008. This was followed, 10 days later, with a formal apology by the then Prime Minister Stephen Harper.

This commission led to the acknowledgment of cultural genocide and settlement agreements. Residential school denialism has sparked policy debates, including proposals that the Government of Canada criminalize residential school denialism under hate speech laws. However, legal scholars have previously asserted that legislation restricting "freedom of expression" would likely not survive a constitutional challenge under the Canadian Charter.

== See also ==
- List of Indian residential schools in Canada
- Native American boarding schools (United States)
- Cultural assimilation of Native Americans
- Media portrayals of the Canadian Indian residential school system
- Native schools (New Zealand)
- Stolen Generations (Australia)
- Christianity and colonialism
