= CARE Principles for Indigenous Data Governance =

Principles created to advance data rights

The CARE Principles for Indigenous Data Governance are a set of principles intended to guide open data projects in engaging Indigenous Peoples rights and interests. CARE was created in 2019 by the International Indigenous Data Sovereignty Interest Group, a group that is a part of the Research Data Alliance. It outlines collective rights related to open data in the context of the United Nations Declaration on the Rights of Indigenous Peoples and Indigenous data sovereignty.

CARE is an acronym which stands for Collective Benefit, Authority to Control, Responsibility, Ethics. The CARE Principles are 'people and purpose-oriented, reflecting the crucial role of data in advancing Indigenous innovation and self-determination', and intended as a complement to the data-oriented perspective of other standards such as FAIR data (findable, accessible, interoperable, reusable).

The CARE principles have been embedded into the Beta version of Standardised Data on Initiatives (STARDIT). CARE principles were the basis of a submission to the UN's Global Digital Compact.

== The acronym ==
=== C for Collective Benefit ===
The design of data ecosystems should work in a way that benefits Indigenous peoples. Indigenous groups should receive help with the use of the data. This way, institutions empower Indigenous communities by enabling them to understand the reality of their nations. It is through actions supported by governments and institutions that promote innovation and development of the communities. This also improves the participation of citizens in decision-making as Indigenous people gain access to information that helps them understand the impact of different decisions. All of this shall be applied fairly and in light of the impact on Indigenous communities.

=== A for Authority to Control ===
Indigenous peoples should have the authority to control Indigenous data supported by their rights and interests. This means giving them the power to decide how the data is used and presented. It is connected to the right to access data that represents the Indigenous perspective, and to have agency over the way data is protected. This is based on the recognition of individual rights held by Indigenous people. For example, the right to access data that is relevant to the Indigenous culture.

=== R for Responsibility ===
The responsibility to share how Indigenous data is used in relation to Indigenous autonomy. It may be through monitoring the use of data so it respects the Indigenous communities or by sharing different accurate resources. This is to protect the relationship with and the dignity of Indigenous people. It can also be supported by increasing data literacy among Indigenous groups and encouraging them to join the data workforce.

=== E for Ethics ===
Indigenous peoples should always be the priority throughout the data life cycle. This means decreasing all potential harm by avoiding misrepresentation of Indigenous peoples. It is applied within the framework of UNDRIP and must consider the impact on the communities from their own perspective. Future harms should be especially investigated, as well as the limitations and difficulties that data governance could cause.

== History ==
=== Inspiration ===
The way research and data were representing Indigenous groups in the past was often misaligned with their cultures and rights. At first, the data belonged only to the researcher. However, it changed with open data and open science movements, which created collective ownership of the data. This was not enough, though, to authenticate Indigenous heritage and strengthen Indigenous peoples' agency over collected data. Inspired by the First Nations principles of OCAP, introduced in Canada, Indigenous Data Sovereignty networks called for the creation of global principles for Indigenous data governance. It required a global scale, as Indigenous groups are present in over 90 countries and consist of over 476 million people. What distinguishes them is a strong relation with the land before it was colonized as well as unique social and economic systems.

== See also ==
- FAIR data
- First Nations principles of OCAP
- Data sovereignty
- Indigenous data governance
