= OCAP =

OCAP may stand for:

- Ontario Coalition Against Poverty
- OpenCable Application Platform
- Object-capability model ("Object Capabilities")
- First Nations principles of OCAP (ownership, control, access, possession)
