= Mohawk Institute Residential School =

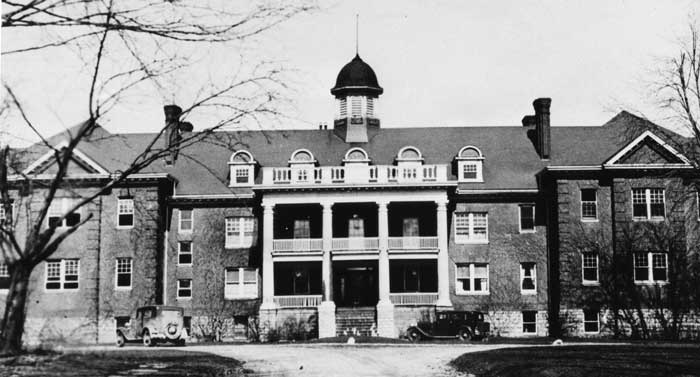
- The Mohawk Institute c. 1932.

Location
- Brantford, Ontario; Canada; 43.12760°N 80.24039°W

Information
- Type: Canadian Indigenous residential school
- Established: 1828
- Closed: 27 June 1970
- Principal: see § Principals
- Enrolment: 90 to 200
- Language: English

The Mohawk Institute Residential School was a Canadian Indian residential school in Brantford, Ontario, Canada. The school operated from 1831 to June 27, 1970. Enrollment at the school ranged from 90 to 200 students per year.

== History ==
Operated by the Society for the Propagation of the Gospel in New England (commonly known as the New England Company) from its founding in 1828 as the "Mechanics' Institute" (a day school for boys on the Six Nations of the Grand River reserve) until 1922, when the Canadian federal government took control. The Mohawk Institute was established on 350 acres of farmland, all of which was or had been part of the Six Nations reserve at some point.

In 1831, the New England Company operated this residential school for boys, and starting in 1834, Indigenous girls attended this school as well. They were from Six Nations, along with some from the New Credit, and Moraviantown, Sarnia, Walpole Island, Muncey, Scugog, Stoney Point, Saugeen, Bay of Quinte and Kahnawake reserves.

While the school was originally near the Mohawk village, in 1837 the colonial government of Upper Canada ordered Six Nation residents to resettle south of the Grand River, kilometres from the school. Between 1854–1859, the building was destroyed by fire and rebuilt a few hundred metres from its original location. Around the same time, the school acquired more land, and farming became a prominent part of life for children at the school. In 1885, the school began to accept students from reserves beyond Six Nations.

On April 19, 1903, the main school building was again destroyed by fire. In May, the barns of the Mohawk School were also destroyed by fire. On June 24, 1903 the playhouse which had been serving as the boys' dorm since the main fire in April was also burned down. All three of these fires have been attributed to students at the school. The school buildings were rebuilt the following year. The new school building contained separate boys and girls wings, principal's and teachers quarters, as well as administrative offices. This new school building was designed to hold 150 students and the new complex also included the development of barns, stables, and other agriculture related out buildings.

In 1922, management of the school was formally taken over by the Canadian government, though the New England Company retained ownership, and the agreement required that the principal be Anglican. A chapel was added to the school in 1930. By 1955, enrollment reached 185 children.

In 1963, farming was discontinued as the children were now given a full day of education without requiring manual labour. Enrollment decreased as schools were built on reserves throughout Ontario, and in 1970, the school was closed. Six Nations assumed ownership of the building the following year.

== Abuse ==
Many former students have described suffering physical, sexual and emotional abuse at the school. The poor quality of food served to students led to the school's nickname, The Mush Hole.

In 1914 two former students from the Mohawk School charged the school's principal for cutting off their hair, imprisonment, and physical abuse. The case went to trial on March 31, 1914 where the students were awarded $400 for two of the claims and the principal was fined.

Students frequently ran away from the Mohawk Institute, so the staff built a prison cell to hold captured runaways in the basement. It resembled a dark closet, and students were often left there for days at a time. One former student, Lorna, who attended the Mohawk Institute from 1940 to 1945, recalled being given shock treatment for wetting the bed. "They used to bring in a battery—a motor of some sort or some kind of gadget, and he’d put the girl’s hand on it and it would jerk us and it would go all the way through us from end to end—it would travel. And we would do that about three times." Another former student, Dawn, said sexual abuse took place in the boiler room in the basement: "You couldn’t hear their screams over the noise of the boiler."

Sally General, a former student who attended the Mohawk Institute from age four to thirteen, recalled having all of her hair cut off, along with all of the other students. They were branded "Mush Hole Baldies". Sally also remembered being locked in a dark room with her friend and being told by staff that "the rats were gonna get us". They would cry for hours, not knowing why they were being punished. It wasn't until she learned English that she realized she was being punished for not knowing or speaking English. Sally was also sexually abused. After one assault, she began to bleed and went to the nurse. When she told the nurse what happened, the nurse gave her a beating, told her she was lying, and that she should never say anything like that again.

Male children at the Mohawk Institute were forced to get a circumcision and have their tonsils removed.

== Principals ==
The following individuals served as principals of the Mohawk Institute during its operation:

Principal Name	Years
Rev. Abraham Nelles	1831–1870
Rev. Robert Ashton (Also Chaplain of Mohawk Chapel from 1885–1915)	1870–1903
Major Alfred Nelles Ashton (son of Robert Ashton)	1903–1914
Alice M. Boyce (Acting Principal)	1914–1915
Rev. Cyril M. Turnell	1915–1918
Alice. M. Boyce	1918–1922
Sydney Rogers	1922–1929
Rev. Horace W. Snell (Also Chaplain of Mohawk Chapel)	1929–1945
Rev. William John Zimmerman (Principal/Administrator and Chaplain of Mohawk Chapel)	1945–1970

== Today ==
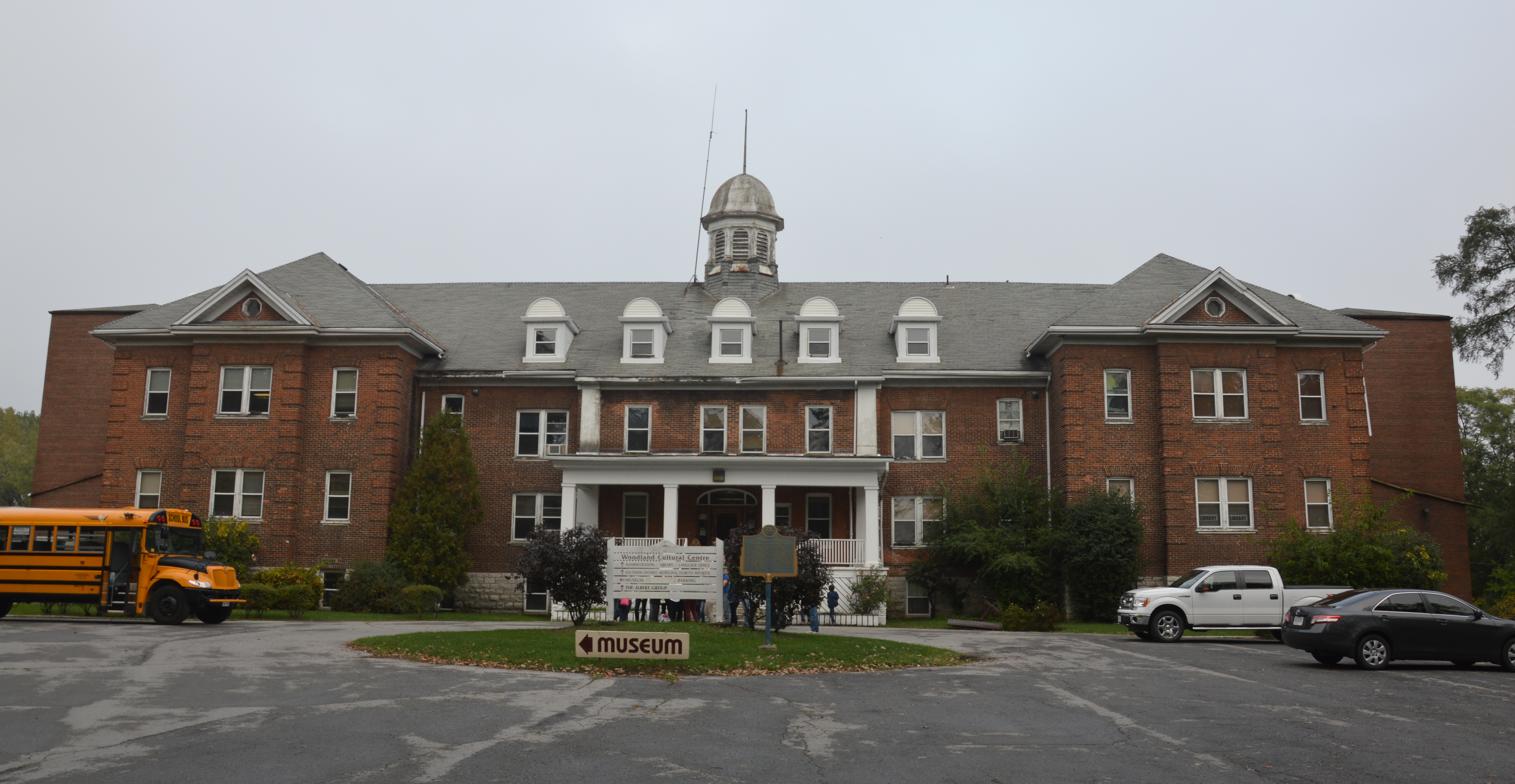
The Mohawk Institute in 2013.

Following the closure of the Mohawk Institute in 1970, the Woodland Cultural Centre opened on the site in 1972, as an organization focused on research, history, and later the arts. Woodland's cultural and historical interpretation programming utilizes the historic Mohawk Institute building to teach about the history of residential schools in Canada.

In 2013 a leak in the roof of the residential school building caused significant damage to the historic site. As a result of this leak a community input process was established within Six Nations of the Grand River to determine what the local community wanted to do with the building, 98% of participants voted to save the historic building. In March 2014 the "Save the Evidence" campaign was started to raise money to preserve the Mohawk Institute and to raise awareness about the history of residential schools.

Following the 2021 discovery of previously unknown burials at the Kamloops Indian Residential School in British Columbia, Six Nations of the Grand River chief Mark Hill called on the Canadian federal government to support a search for missing children who could have been buried on the Mohawk Institute's grounds. The search began around November 2021. As of September 2022, about 1.5% of the total area of the grounds had been searched. Separately, the survivors group leading the investigation into deaths at the former residential school have identified 97 deaths with ties to the Mohawk Institute through review of documents.

== Legacy ==
The history and student experience at the Mohawk Institute has contributed to the works of a number of authors and artists including:

- Graham, Elizabeth (1997). The Mush Hole: Life at Two Indian Residential Schools. Waterloo, Ontario: Heffle Publishing. ISBN 0-9683179-0-1.
- Harper, Maddie (1993). "Mush-hole" Memories of a Residential School. Carlos Freire. Toronto, Ontario: The Turtle Island Publication Group. ISBN 0-920813-98-4.
- "Mush Hole Remembered: R.G. Miller", a series of paintings by artist R.G. Miller based on his experience as a student at the Mohawk Institute.
- "Opening Doors to Dialogue" community art project led by Samuel Thomas and the Woodland Cultural Centre used the physical building of the Mohawk Institute as inspiration for a community dialogue, healing, and art.

== See also ==
- Canadian Indian Residential School System
- List of Indian residential schools in Canada
