= First Nations principles of OCAP =

The First Nations principles of OCAP^{®} establish an Indigenous data governance standard for how First Nations' data and information should be collected, protected, used, and shared. OCAP^{®} is an acronym for the principles of ownership, control, access, and possession. The principles were established in 1998 by Canadian First Nations leadership and are a trademark of the Canadian non-profit the First Nations Information Governance Centre (FNIGC).

== OCAP^{®} ==
The OCAP^{®} principles are set of standards for First Nations' information governance which are intended to support First Nations' path to data sovereignty. OCAP^{®} principles also apply when conducting research using First Nations' data, particularly informing data collection and management.

Ownership refers to the relationship of First Nations to their cultural knowledge, data, and information. This principle states that a community or group owns information collectively in the same way that an individual owns their personal information.

Control affirms that First Nations, their communities, and representative bodies are within their rights to seek control over all aspects of research and information management processes that impact them. This principle extends to the control of resources and review processes, the planning process, management of the information, and any other component of information processes.

Access refers to the assertion that First Nations must have access to information and data about themselves and their communities regardless of where it is held. The principle of access also refers to the right of First Nations' communities and organizations to manage and make decisions regarding access to their collective information.

Possession, or stewardship, refers to the physical control of data. It is more concrete than ownership, which identifies the relationship between a people and their information in principle. Possession is the mechanism by which ownership can be asserted and protected.

== History ==
The First Nations principles of OCAP^{®} were first established in 1998 by the National Steering Committee in charge of administering the First Nations Regional Longitudinal Health Survey (RHS), which preceded the First Nations Regional Health Survey (FNRHS or RHS). These principles help in enhancing First Nation resources and facilitating nation building while maintaining legitimacy and accountability for First Nation authorities and institutions.

OCAP^{®} is a registered trademark of FNIGC, a Canada-based non-profit organization. FNIGC states that it sought to trademark OCAP^{®} to protect the principles from misuse and improper interpretation that could distort their original intent.

== First Nations Information Governance Centre ==
FNIGC is an independent, apolitical, and technical non-profit organization operating with a special mandate from the Assembly of First Nations' Chiefs-in-Assembly. FNIGC's stated vision is that "every First Nation will achieve data sovereignty in alignment with its distinct worldview."
