= Indigenous data governance =

Data governance in the context of Indigenous data involves supporting the data interests, gaps and priorities of Indigenous peoples, in order to enable Indigenous self-determination. Generally, data governance refers to who has ownership, control and access over the use of data. Indigenous data governance requires the data to surround Indigenous peoples and its purpose to reflect Indigenous needs and priorities, rather than omitting Indigenous peoples in the production of Indigenous data.

== Overview ==
Indigenous data governance is key in enabling Indigenous self-determinism and rebuilding strong Indigenous nations. Oftentimes, Indigenous peoples do not have access to relevant Indigenous data. Currently in Canada, much information on Indigenous peoples are considered government data that fall under Crown copyright, limiting access to relevant data such as archeological sites that are of significance to Indigenous nations. Thus, Indigenous data that lacks strong data governance often misrepresent Indigenous peoples, help inform policies that have discriminatory impacts on Indigenous peoples, and uphold colonial practices.

=== Definition of Indigenous data ===
Indigenous data can include knowledge and information on census, health and other administrative data about Indigenous peoples, information on the environment, non-humans and resources, and information on cultural heritage such as oral histories, clan knowledge and cultural sites. Indigenous data be produced by Indigenous people, governments, other institutions, and corporations. In terms of rebuilding Indigenous nations, Indigenous data can be useful for tribal governments when making decisions about their resources and communities.

== Indigenous data sovereignty ==
Companies and states often have the power in deciding what kind of data is produced and for what purposes. Data sovereignty in the context of Indigenous data is about ensuring that Indigenous people have a say in the data that is produced about them, how this data is shared and the purpose behind sharing the data. Data sovereignty holds significance for Indigenous peoples, as marginalized groups of people, because it allows them to protect their land, cultural heritage and knowledge.

Indigenous data sovereignty has received formal recognition from the United Nations through the United Nations Declaration on the Rights of Indigenous Peoples (UNDRIP). UNDRIP was formed by the United Nations in 2007. UNDRIP provides a universal framework of human rights standards that should be met in relation to Indigenous peoples, in addition to existing human rights standards.

=== CARE principles ===
An early framework that addressed the lack of Indigenous peoples authority in the production of Indigenous data was the First Nations principles of OCAP. More recently, The CARE principles of Indigenous data governance have been created by the Global Indigenous Data Alliance (GIDA 2019) as a framework for open data initiatives in incorporating Indigenous data sovereignty. The CARE principles are an extension of the FAIR principles of open data, which focus on increasing data sharing and data accessibility devoid of historical context and power dynamics. In contrast to the FAIR principles of open data, the CARE principles are people and purpose oriented rather than data oriented, and are rooted in Indigenous world views.

== See also ==
- CARE Principles for Indigenous Data Governance
- FAIR data
- Open data
