= Data sovereignty =

Concept in law and ethics

Data sovereignty means that data generated within a country's borders is governed by that nation's laws and regulatory frameworks; this ensures local control over data access, storage, and usage. In other words, a country is able to control and access the data that is generated in its territories. An example of a nation's data sovereignty policy would be Australia's Privacy Act 1988, which established the Australian Privacy Principles (APPs) that regulate the handling of personal information by government agencies and private sector organizations. The APP contains 13 principles for how all personal or organizational data in Australia is meant to be kept. For many countries, the issue of data sovereignty is presented as an issue of national security with concerns over being able to protect citizens' personal data. Data can be used to help improve medical care, reinforce national security as well as have a positive impact on many economic and social infrastructures but may also be used for identity theft and other data related attacks.

The concept of data sovereignty is closely linked with data security, cloud computing, digital sovereignty, network sovereignty, and technological sovereignty. Unlike technological sovereignty, which is vaguely defined and can be used as an umbrella term in policymaking, data sovereignty is specifically concerned with questions surrounding the data itself. The issue of managing data sovereignty can be considered more complex when introducing the idea of cloud computing, where data can be accessed globally; meaning organizations and companies must comply with multiple nations' data laws. Data sovereignty is also associated with data localization, the requirement that data be stored within a specified region, and data residency, the actual location in which the data is stored, such as cloud servers.

Data sovereignty as the idea that data is subject to the laws and governance structures within one nation, is usually discussed in one of two ways: in relation to Indigenous groups and Indigenous autonomy from post-colonial states, or in relation to transnational data flow. With the rise of cloud computing, many countries have passed various laws around the control and storage of data, which all reflect measures of data sovereignty. More than 100 countries have some form of data sovereignty laws in place. With self-sovereign identity (SSI), the individual identity holders can fully create and control their credentials, although a nation can still issue a digital identity in that paradigm.

== History ==
The Snowden revelations on the National Security Agency's (NSA) PRISM program provided a catalyst for global data sovereignty discussions. It was revealed that the US was collecting vast swaths of data not only from American citizens, but from around the world. The program was designed "to 'receive' emails, video clips, photos, voice and video calls, social networking details, logins and other data held by a range of US internet firms" such as American tech companies like Facebook, Apple, Google, and Twitter, among others. In the wake of the revelations, countries became increasingly concerned with who could access their national information and its potential repercussions. Their worries were further exacerbated due to the US Patriot Act. Under the act, US officials were granted access to any information physically within the United States (such as server farms), regardless of the information's origin. This meant that any information collected by an American server would have no protection from the US government.

Another instance that put data sovereignty in the news was a case between Microsoft and the US government. In 2013, the Department of Justice (DoJ) demanded that Microsoft grant the DoJ access to emails "related to a narcotics case from a Hotmail account hosted in Ireland". Microsoft refused, stating that this transfer would result in the company breaking data localization and protecting laws in the EU. The initial ruling was in favor of the US government, with Magistrate James Francis concluding that American companies "must turn over private information when served with a valid search warrant from US law enforcement agencies". Microsoft asked for an appeal and went to court again in 2016 with the case Microsoft v. United States. John Frank, the VP for EU Government Affairs at Microsoft, stated in a 2016 blog post that a US court of appeals ruled in favor of Microsoft, supporting the notion that "US search warrants do not reach our customers' data stored abroad". On October 23, 2017, Microsoft said it would drop the lawsuit as a result of a policy change by the Department of Justice (DoJ) that represented "most of what Microsoft was asking for."

== Indigenous context ==
Discussions of Indigenous data sovereignty for Indigenous peoples of Canada, New Zealand, Australia, and the United States of America were underway as of 2017. Data sovereignty is seen by Indigenous peoples and activists as a key piece to self-governance structures and an important pillar of Indigenous sovereignty as a whole. The decolonization of data is seen by activists as a way to give power to Indigenous people to "determine who should be counted among them" and would be able to better reflect the "interests, values and priorities of native people". Scholars also argue that given the power over their own data, Indigenous peoples would be able to decide which data gets disseminated to the public and what does not, a decision typically made by the settler government. According to author Peter Yu, as discussed in his article on the Power of Data in Aboriginal Hands, the significant gaps in statistical data that can be seen with indigenous people is highlighted in importance. It is believed that by restoring control over data, new possibilities for improvement will open and lead to increased understanding, dialogue, accountability, and even "informed decision-making" which one could argue would give the power back to indigenous people. Currently some researchers, such as Ray Lovett, argue that there is a significant issue when looking at statistical expertise and capacity. In fact, it is believed that if statistical capacity is increased it could be the exact pivoting point that indigenous peoples will need in order to better "assert data sovereignty".

In New Zealand, Te Mana Raraunga, a Māori data sovereignty network, created a charter to outline what Māori data sovereignty would look like. Some of the requests in the charter included "asserting Māori rights and interests in relation to data", "advocating for Māori involvement in the governance of data repositories" and "Supporting the development of Māori data infrastructure and security systems".

In Canada, Gwen Phillips of the Ktunaxa nation of British Columbia has been advocating for Ktunaxa data sovereignty and other pathways towards self-governance in the community.

Data sovereignty, in regard to indigenous groups, can also be viewed under the lens of health data as it is collected and stored in the nation for research purposes. Many Indigenous groups today are reluctant to share health data due to a history of exploitation and improper handling of their data as well as their data being historically used in ways that they did not consent or agree to. Some scholars argue that in order for the creation of a complete global genomic conservation effort to be feasible, it will need to work within the framework of Indigenous data sovereignty. At the United Nations' level, the UN General Assembly formally agreed to adopt the UN's Declaration on the Rights of Indigenous Peoples. This declaration confirms that indigenous people have the right to control their own scientific and technical data, including the ability to protect and maintain their own human and genetic resources. Additionally, in light of this declaration, the study Access and Management: Indigenous Perspectives on Genomic Data Sharing, observed that when various individuals from different tribes were asked if they think tribes should share their data or not, most were fairly apprehensive. To be specific, most participants expressed an emphasis on confidentiality and deidentification. Although, many shared a common view on remaining anonymous, they did however vary when it came to whether or not the data should be shared. While some were apprehensive and did not feel comfortable sharing this data, others were fine with letting this information be public. Despite being open to sharing the data many individuals had specific caveats. In fact, one participant believed that if they were to share this data then they "need to do a better job of understanding what that data-sharing really means, and what's done with it."

Discussions of Indigenous data sovereignty have also increasingly intersected with digital infrastructure, including tribally owned data centers and related network facilities, as Indigenous nations and enterprises seek greater control over where data is stored, governed, and accessed.

== National data sovereignty measures ==
Canada has enacted various data sovereignty measures, primarily on the storage of Canadian data on Canadian servers. As part of Canada's IT strategy for the years 2016–2020, data localization measures were discussed as a way to uphold citizens' privacy. By using Canadian servers to store Canadian data as opposed to American servers, this would safeguard Canadian data from being subject to the US Patriot Act. In 2017, it was discovered that Shared Services Canada and the Communications Security Establishment were "exploring options for sensitive data storage on U.S.-based servers" with Microsoft".

Also in 2016, the EU Parliament approved its own data sovereignty measures within a General Data Protection Regulation (GDPR). This regulatory package homogenizes data protection policy for all European Union members. It also includes an addendum that establishes extraterritorial jurisdiction for its rules to extend to any data controller or processor whose subjects are EU citizens, regardless of the location the holding or processing is conducted. This forces companies based outside of the EU to reevaluate their sitewide policies and align them with another country's law. The GDPR also effectively replaced the 1995 European Data Protection Directive that had originally established the free movement of personal data between member state borders, and in doing so granted interoperability of such data among nearly thirty countries.

In Finland, the concept of data and digital sovereignty has also been addressed through civic engagement. One example is the citizens' initiative Digital Independence ("Digitaalinen itsenäisyys" in Finnish, "Digitalt självständighet" in Swedish), launched on the government-run platform on the 4th of February 2026. The initiative argues that dependency on third-country digital infrastructure and services can weaken national autonomy and seeks legislative or policy measures to strengthen Finland's control over its critical digital systems and data governance. Supporters aim to prompt parliamentary consideration and legislation of issues related to strategic digital autonomy within public administration and national infrastructure.

== United States extraterritorial data access laws ==
The CLOUD Act allows United States authorities to request data from covered service providers regardless of where the data is physically stored. Courts can require parent companies to provide data held by their subsidiaries, and such orders may be accompanied by nondisclosure requirements preventing the provider from notifying affected users. This framework has been described in legal commentary as creating legal tension with Article 48 of the General Data Protection Regulation (GDPR), which restricts the transfer of personal data in response to foreign court or administrative orders unless based on an international agreement. As a result, service providers operating in both jurisdictions may face competing legal obligations under U.S. and EU law.

Section 702 of the Foreign Intelligence Surveillance Act (FISA) is a provision of United States federal law that authorizes intelligence agencies to compel electronic communication service providers to assist in the collection of foreign intelligence. The authority targets non U.S. persons, including individuals and entities, reasonably believed to be located outside the United States and operates without individualized warrants, instead relying on programmatic certifications approved by the Foreign Intelligence Surveillance Court. The program has been described by the government as an important national security tool and has also drawn criticism over the incidental collection of communications involving U.S. persons.

== Criticism ==
A common criticism of data sovereignty brought forward by corporate actors is that it impedes and has the potential to destroy processes in cloud computing. Since cloud storage might be dispersed and disseminated in a variety of locations at any given time, it is argued that governance of cloud computing is difficult under data sovereignty laws. For example, data held in the cloud may be illegal in some jurisdictions but legal in others. The concept of a sovereign cloud is proposed as a solution to address this challenge.

Some scholars have presented the argument that data sovereignty involves the authority of the state being able to control data. This excessive power that the state and a few large corporations hold, due to their direct influence over data resources, can undermine the security of data sovereignty.

According to economist and political science professor Susan Ariel Aaronson, founder and director of the Digital Trade and Data Governance Hub at George Washington University, "some governments are seeking to regulate the commercial use of personal data without enacting clear rules governing public sector use... The hoarding of data by nations or firms may reduce data generativity and the public benefits of data analysis."

== See also ==
- Cybersecurity
- Data governance
- Data localization
- Digital inclusion
- Digital nationalism
- Digital self-determination
- Legal aspects of computing
- Network sovereignty
- Privacy
  - Information privacy, or data protection
  - Privacy law
- Sovereigntism
