= St. Margaret's Residential School =

Coordinates: 48.6290°N 93.3594°W

St. Margaret's Residential School was part of the Canadian Residential School System in Northwestern Ontario (Fort Frances). The school ran from 1906 to 1974. It was run by the Oblates and the Grey Nuns. Many alumni have spoken out regarding the treatment they received at this school.

== History ==
In 1905, the Oblates of Mary Immaculate and the Department of Indian Affairs decided to shut down the St. Boniface Industrial School. It was then decided that the school would be replaced by a residential school located on the Couchiching Reserve, on the southwest shore of Rainy Lake, northeast of Fort Frances.

This new school was overseen by three brothers: Brother Théodore, Brother Eugène Gauthier, and Charles Sylvestre.

On April 1, 1906, St. Margaret's opened and remained in operation until September 1974. The school was run by the Oblates and the Grey Nuns, who were responsible for teaching and managing the school. At the beginning, the Department of Indian Affairs only authorized the school to take in 40 students.

As the school grew, the government provided more land to support it, including an additional twenty acres. During this time, a large part of the school's food supply came from agricultural work done by both the priests and the students. By 1909, the number of students had increased to 52, and by 1911 the school expanded further under the supervision of Father Philippe Valès, with help from Brother Théodore. This expansion increased the school's capacity from 40 to 60 students, and the government later provided another 90 acres of land.

In 1919, an influenza outbreak spread through the school, infecting students and staff. This led to an increase in staff to help manage the situation. After conditions improved, the government provided various supplies to support the school, such as electricity and water tanks.

In 1950, the school continued to expand, and St. Margaret's Residential School could now accept up to 100 students. In 1963, the Government of Canada provided a more modern building, relocating the students to a larger space that could house up to 120 students.

== Practices ==
St Margaret's Residential school was run by two groups – the Oblates and the Grey Nuns. Both groups are associated with the Roman Catholic religion and have been associated to the practice of assimilation throughout Canada's history. The school was subject to arguments about whether it should be conducted as a day or residential school. The choice was made by both the government and school officials that the school would run as a residential school, where pupils would live during work and schooling.

J.N Poitras, a priest working in the school noted in a letter to the Superintendent General of Indian Affairs and the Principal at St. Margaret's that the skills girls and boys were independently taught could not be accomplished at a day school, and past attempts to do so had been failures. The goal was to teach girls at the school domestic skills and to teach boys skills to maintain “sustenance” as they aged. These arguments from Poitras and other religious figures prompted St. Margaret to be a Residential School where children lived full-time.

St. Margaret housed both Indigenous children and white orphans. The school ran a “half day” system, where one half of the day was dedicated to school and the other half to working. The primary goal of schooling was to teach the English language, as many children came speaking their native tongue (such as Ojibwa).

St. Margaret's often faced scrutiny from parents and its own staff for unsafe conditions. Children frequently dealt with unsanitary methods of drinking water. Often, the same cups that children used outside in the dirt were used for drinking. This resulted in many complaints about sore mouths. The sewage system was poor and often leaked into the nearby town of St. Frances. Once, the raw sewage backed up and leaked into the school itself.

Indigenous peoples who attended St. Margaret's reported that they were banned from returning home to see their family during their time at the school. One man named Glenn Jourdain shared his opinion that the purpose of this school was to “Kill the Indian Culture.” In 1960, St. Margaret's transitioned to a day school where children no longer lived. This later qualified survivors of the school for a different type of governmental compensation (see Legal Repercussions).

== Stories from a living survivor ==
Some information about St. Margaret's Residential School comes from the testimonies and life stories of former students. One example is the account of Karen Chaboyer, an Ojibwa woman from Rainy River First Nation who attended the school as a child. She attended St. Margaret's for 9 years, from the age of six to fifteen. During her time at the school, Karen noted that she did not have the same experience as most of the other students. She shares that growing up, her parents did not teach her the Ojibwa language, which separated her from the other students. In later reflections, she stated that this “saved [her] from many spankings” that other students received for speaking their language at school.

After leaving the residential school system, Chaboyer was faced with multiple personal challenges. She described growing up in a family that was greatly affected by alcoholism, fearing she would repeat similar patterns for the rest of her life. For several years, she coped with the negative effects residential schooling had on her through alcohol and other addictive substances. Eventually, she reached out and got treatment through rehabilitation programs and began working towards recovery. During this period, she reflected heavily on the experiences and long-lasting effects that her school had on her identity and development.

Chaboyer later documented the aspects of her journey in the memoir They Called Me 33: Reclaiming Ingo-Waabigwan. In the book, she recounts her years at St. Margaret's Residential School and describes how the school system affected her sense of identity, which is a common experience reported by many other former students. The memoir also discusses her past trauma and her journey to rebuilding her life after leaving the school system. Chaboyer has shared her experiences as part of much larger efforts to bring light to residential school survivors and acknowledge history.

== Legal repercussions ==
Former students of the school were invited to Stephen Harper's 2008 statement of apology on behalf of both the Canadian Government and population. The apology was witnessed by Indigenous peoples from many communities. It attempted to address the long-term damage inflicted by the opening and continued support of Residential Schools in Canada. Leo Yerxa, a member of the Couchiching First Nation and former student of St. Margaret's was one of the people invited. He noted the difficulty of attending the apology in the House of Commons. Yerxa stated that he reexperienced past trauma, believed that the apology continued to excuse Residential School actions, and that the words of survivors were not taken into account before the statement was issued.

Elders of the Couchiching First Nation who attended St. Margaret's were noted telling other community members stories of children being buried. There is no official confirmation outside of the bodies in the school cemetery. Prior to 1953, the Department of Indian Affairs held no rules or regulations in terms of school discipline. A former student and his son, Curtis and Rudy Bruyere, found a homemade strap covered in what was deemed to be dried blood found in the walls at St. Margaret's. While other Residential Schools have had former staff arrested or criminally charged, no legal repercussions have been taken against former staff members of the St. Margaret's for abuse or maltreatment of its students.

Former students of St. Margaret's were deemed eligible by the Canadian government for multiple compensation initiatives. Those who both attended and lived at the school were able to apply for the Indian Residential Schools Settlement Agreement. This was created at the same time as the official government apology (2008). It includes Common Experience Payment for all former members, providing individual compensation based on time spent in the Residential School System, as well as other more specified programs such as the establishment of the Truth and Reconciliation Commission.

Those who attended as only a day school were eligible to apply for the Indian Residential Schools (Gottfriedson) Day Scholars Settlement Agreement. This agreement made former students eligible for $10,000 in individual compensation, potential financial support for legal counsel, and large sums of money towards collective reconciliation initiatives. This settlement stopped accepting claims in the fall of 2023.

== Societal repercussions and impacts ==
St. Margaret's was one of the 130 residential schools in Canada that forced about 150,000 young Indigenous children away from their families and culture, with the purpose of assimilating them in society at large. Many Indigenous children experienced physical, emotional, and sexual abuse in residential schools, which has created lasting impacts on individuals and communities.

At St. Margaret's, students were punished for various reasons, such as wetting the bed, speaking their language, neglecting chores, or stealing food. When students were punished, staff would use different objects, including handmade straps, horsewhips, hockey sticks, metal rods, shovels, and even their fists, resulting in physical harm. The staff would also deliberately cut students’ hair and twist their ears as a form of public humiliation.

Afterwards, many staff members were charged with assault, and some were even referred to as “sexual terrorists.” The Grey Nuns and the Oblates would purposely use handmade straps and inappropriately hit students, including on their genitals. It was also said that the straps used in St. Margaret's Residential School were used in other residential schools across the province, showing that this abuse was not only happening in one school, but across the country.

It was said that “The residential schools were largely absent from strong policies and that's where so many bad things happened,” said Moran about St. Margaret's Indian Residential School.

All of these different forms of abuse created long-lasting negative impacts, and many individuals who experienced them later struggled with alcoholism as a way to cope with the pain of being taken away from their families at such a young age, as well as the trauma they had carried within them for many years.

The effects of these experiences continued after students left the school. Former students have reported long-term impacts including trauma, substance use, anxiety, depression, and post-traumatic stress disorder, as well as higher rates of suicide. Experiences within residential schools have also been linked to intergenerational effects, including challenges related to family relationships and parenting.
