= Vermilion-Lloydminster-Wainwright =

Provincial electoral district in Alberta, Canada

Alberta electoral district
- Vermilion-Lloydminster-Wainwright within Alberta (2017 boundaries).

Provincial electoral district
- Legislature: Legislative Assembly of Alberta
MLA
Garth Rowswell
United Conservative
- District created: 2017
- First contested: 2019
- Last contested: 2023

Demographics
- Population (2016): 46,042
- Area (km²): 10,091
- Pop. density (per km²): 4.6
- Census division(s): 7, 10
- Census subdivision(s): Makaoo 120, MD of Wainwright, Vermilion River, Lloydminster (Alberta portion), Vermilion, Wainwright, Chauvin, Dewberry, Edgerton, Irma, Kitscoty, Marwayne, Paradise Valley

Vermilion-Lloydminster-Wainwright is a provincial electoral district in Alberta, Canada. The district is one of 87 districts mandated to return a single member (MLA) to the Legislative Assembly of Alberta using the first-past-the-post method of voting. It was contested for the first time in the 2019 Alberta election.

== Geography ==
The district is coterminous with the municipal districts of Wainwright and Vermilion River in eastern Alberta. It is named for its three largest communities, Vermilion, Lloydminster, and Wainwright. Major thoroughfares include Highway 14, the Yellowhead Highway, the interprovincial Highway 17, and Highway 41.

== History ==
Members for Vermilion-Lloydminster-Wainwright
Assembly	Years	Member	Party
See Vermilion-Lloydminster 1993-2019 and Battle River-Wainwright 2004-2019
30th	2019–2023	Garth Rowswell	United Conservative
31st	2023–	Garth Rowswell	United Conservative

The district was created in 2017 when the Electoral Boundaries Commission recommended renaming Vermilion-Lloydminster, transferring its portion of Minburn County to Fort Saskatchewan-Vegreville and absorbing the MD of Wainwright from Battle River-Wainwright. Although the Commission recommended the name Vermilion-Wainwright for this district, the Legislative Assembly decided to retain Lloydminster in the name at the request of Vermilion-Lloydminster MLA Richard Starke.

== Electoral results ==
=== 2023 ===
2023 Alberta general election
Party	Candidate	Votes	%	±%
United Conservative	Garth Rowswell	13,097	74.40	-4.44
New Democratic	Dawn Flaata	3,075	17.47	+7.54
Alberta Party	Darrell Dunn	475	2.70	-3.74
Wildrose Loyalty Coalition	Danny Hozack	460	2.61	–
Independent	Matthew Powell	351	1.99	–
Green	Tigra-Lee Campbell	146	0.83	–
Total		17,604	99.59	–
Rejected and declined		73	0.41	
Turnout		17,677	52.40	
Eligible voters		33,733		
United Conservative hold		Swing		-5.99
Source(s) Source: Elections Alberta

=== 2010s ===
2019 Alberta general election
Party	Candidate	Votes	%	±%
United Conservative	Garth Rowswell	19,768	78.84%	-1.27
New Democratic	Ryan Clarke	2,490	9.93%	-8.71
Alberta Party	Craig G. Peterson	1,615	6.44%	–
Freedom Conservative	Jim Mckinnon	898	3.58%	–
Alberta Advantage Party	Kelly Zeleny	170	0.68%	–
Independent	Robert McFadzean	133	0.53%	–
Total		25,074	–	–
Rejected, spoiled and declined		79	–	–
Eligible electors / turnout		31,465	79.94%	–
United Conservative pickup new district.				
Source(s) Source: "86 - Vermilion-Lloydminster-Wainwright, 2019 Alberta general election". officialresults.elections.ab.ca. Elections Alberta.

Redistributed results, 2015 Alberta election
Progressive Conservative	6,512	43.74%
Wildrose	5,415	36.37%
New Democratic	2,776	18.64%
Others (Note: Includes Liberal votes in Battle River-Wainwright (no candidate in Vermilion-Lloydminster).)	186	1.25%

== See also ==
- List of Alberta provincial electoral districts
- Canadian provincial electoral districts
