= Richard Starke =

Canadian politician

The Honourable Richard Starke ECA

Member of the Legislative Assembly of Alberta for Vermilion-Lloydminster
- In office April 23, 2012 – March 19, 2019
- Preceded by: Lloyd Snelgrove
- Succeeded by: Garth Rowswell

Minister of Tourism, Parks and Recreation
- In office February 4, 2013 – September 15, 2014
- Premier: Alison Redford; Dave Hancock
- Preceded by: Christine Cusanelli
- Succeeded by: Maureen Kubinec

Personal details
- Born: June 18, 1960 (age 66) Edmonton, Alberta, Canada
- Party: Independent PC
- Spouse: Alison Starke
- Children: 2
- Education: University of Saskatchewan
- Profession: Veterinarian

Richard Karl Alfred Starke (born June 18, 1960) is a Canadian politician who represented the electoral district of Vermilion-Lloydminster in the Legislative Assembly of Alberta. Starke was elected to his first term as MLA for Vermilion-Lloydminster on April 23, 2012. Starke was appointed the minister for Tourism, Parks, and Recreation on February 4, 2013. He was not included in the Cabinet sworn in on September 15, 2014, but was appointed Chair of the Rural Health Services Review Committee on September 23, 2014. He is one of only two PC MLAs to be elected outside the city of Calgary in the 2015 provincial election.

Starke ran for the leadership of the Progressive Conservatives in 2017 but was decisively beaten by Jason Kenney who campaigned on a merger with the Wildrose Party. When the merger was approved by both party memberships, Starke was the only MLA from either party to not join the United Conservative Party caucus. Richard Starke was permitted to maintain his PC status in the legislature even though the party was no longer functioning.

== Personal life ==
Starke was born and raised in Edmonton. He and his wife, Alison, have two adult sons. They reside near Lloydminster, Alberta.

He coached speed skating.

== Education and work ==
Richard graduated from Queen Elizabeth High School in Edmonton and attended the University of Alberta Faculty of Agriculture and Forestry for his pre-vet studies. In 1979, he was accepted to the Western College of Veterinary Medicine at the University of Saskatchewan. He attained the degree of Doctor of Veterinary Medicine (with Distinction) in 1983.

He joined the Lloydminster Animal Hospital in 1983 and became an owner in 1985. He was also elected to the Lloydminster city council in 1985 and served two terms as alderman. While Richard was Senior Partner at the Lloydminster Animal Hospital, the practice received several awards:

- 1999 Alberta Business Awards of Distinction, Finalist, Small Business category
- 2003 Lloydminster Chamber of Commerce Customer Service Award
- 2010 Lloydminster Chamber of Commerce Small Business of the Year nominee
- 2011 Lloydminster Chamber of Commerce Small Business of the Year and Business of the Year Award winner

A second practice, Companion Animal Care Centre, was opened in 2008 and received 2010 Lloydminster Chamber of Commerce Rookie Business of the Year Award winner. He sold both practices before running for politics in 2011.

== Volunteer service ==
Starke has served on a wide variety of professional, national, provincial, municipal, cultural, community service and sport committees. While he was on Lloydminster City Council he served on the Lloydminster Leisure Centre Building Committee and chaired the Barr Colony Heritage Cultural Centre Building Committee. He served on the Communications Committee of the Canadian Veterinary Medical Association, as well as the Public Relations, Economic, and Professional Review Committees of the Alberta Veterinary Medical Association. In 1992, he was a founding member of the Lloydminster German Heritage Society. He joined the Lloydminster Rotary Club in 1988 and was a Charter Member of the Border City Rotary Club, serving as President of that club in 2005. He served on the Lloydminster Region Health Foundation Board from 2002 to 2011, the last two years as Board Chair. He served as Director of Coaching & Programs at the Lloydminster Border Blades Speed Skating Club, and on the Coaching Development Committee at Speed Skating Canada.

== Election results ==
2015 Alberta general election: Vermilion-Lloydminster
| Party | Candidate | Votes | % | ±% |
|---|---|---|---|---|
| Progressive Conservative | Richard Starke | 5,935 | 47.35% | -4.60% |
| Wildrose | Danny Hozack | 4,171 | 33.28% | -4.17% |
| New Democratic | Saba Mossagizi | 2,428 | 19.37% | 15.92% |
| Total | | 12,534 | – | – |
| Rejected, spoiled and declined | | 55 | – | – |
| Eligible electors / turnout | | 26,918 | 46.77% | -5.04% |
| Progressive Conservative hold | | Swing | | -0.21% |
Source(s) Source: "Elections Alberta 2015 General Election". Elections Alberta.

2012 Alberta general election: Vermilion-Lloydminster
| Party | Candidate | Votes | % | ±% |
|---|---|---|---|---|
| Progressive Conservative | Richard Starke | 6,255 | 51.95% | -28.80% |
| Wildrose | Danny Hozack | 4,509 | 37.45% | – |
| Liberal | Corina Ganton | 463 | 3.85% | -5.67% |
| New Democratic | Ray Stone | 415 | 3.45% | -2.10% |
| Independent | Richard Yaceyko | 399 | 3.31% | – |
| Total | | 12,041 | – | – |
| Rejected, spoiled and declined | | 52 | – | – |
| Eligible electors / turnout | | 23,340 | 51.81% | 14.64% |
| Progressive Conservative hold | | Swing | | -28.37% |
Source(s) Source: "Elections Alberta 2012 General Election". Elections Alberta.
