= Murray Sinclair =

Canadian lawyer and politician (1951–2024)

The Honourable Murray Sinclair CC KC OM MSC
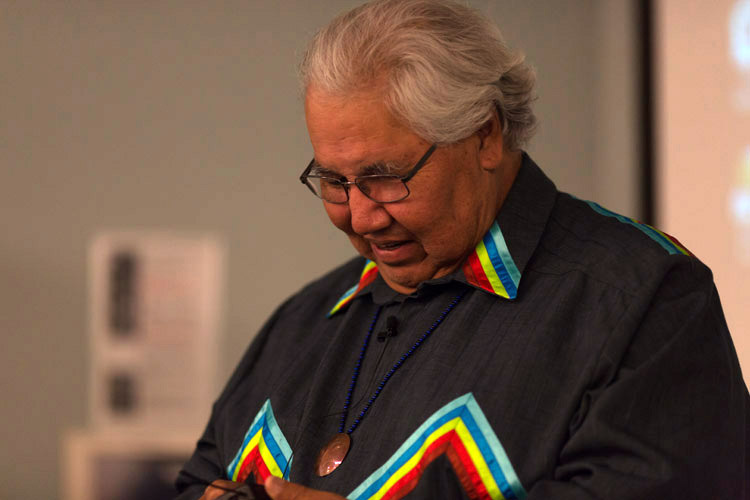
- Murray Sinclair at the Shingwauk 2015 Gathering at Algoma University

15th Chancellor of Queen's University
- In office July 1, 2021 – June 30, 2024
- Principal: Patrick Deane
- Preceded by: Jim Leech
- Succeeded by: Shelagh Rogers

Canadian Senator from Manitoba
- In office April 2, 2016 – January 31, 2021
- Nominated by: Justin Trudeau
- Preceded by: Rod Zimmer
- Succeeded by: Gigi Osler

Chair of the Truth and Reconciliation Commission of Canada
- In office 2009–2015
- Preceded by: Position established
- Succeeded by: Position abolished

Personal details
- Born: Calvin Murray Sinclair; January 24, 1951 Selkirk, Manitoba, Canada
- Died: November 4, 2024 (aged 73) Winnipeg, Manitoba, Canada
- Party: Independent Senators Group
- Spouse: Katherine Morrisseau-Sinclair
- Children: 5, including Niigaan
- Education: University of Winnipeg (BA); University of Manitoba (LLB)
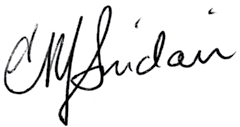
- Signature

Calvin Murray Sinclair CC KC OM MSC (Ojibwe name Mazina Giizhik; January 24, 1951 – November 4, 2024) was a Canadian politician and lawyer. On April 2, 2016, Sinclair was appointed to the Senate of Canada, serving until his resignation on January 31, 2021. Prior to his appointment to the senate, he was chair of the Indian Residential Schools Truth and Reconciliation Commission from 2009 to 2015.

On July 1, 2021, Sinclair became the 15th Chancellor of Queen's University, succeeding Jim Leech. He declined to seek reappointment, with his term expiring on June 30, 2024. Instead, he accepted a new role as the Chancellor Emeritus and Special Advisor to the Principal on Reconciliation of Queen's University.

== Early life ==
Calvin Murray Sinclair was born on January 24, 1951, and raised on the former St. Peter's Indian Reserve (existed along the shores of the Red River north to the mouth of Netley Creek from 1817-1908 and forced to move to Peguis First Nation) in the Selkirk area north of Winnipeg, Manitoba. His parents were Henry and Florence (née Mason) Sinclair. His siblings were Richard, Henry Jr. (Buddy) and Dianne. An older sister had died in infancy. Their mother, Florence, died in April 1952 following a stroke, and they were raised by their grandparents Henry James Sinclair and Catherine Simard in St. Peter's.

After graduating from high school (Selkirk Collegiate Institute) as class valedictorian and Athlete of the Year in 1968, Sinclair attended the University of Manitoba's School of Physical Education, but left before graduating to take care of his ailing grandmother after his grandfather died in 1970. He then worked at the Selkirk Friendship Centre as an administrator and youth worker and was elected vice president of the Manitoba Métis Federation for the Interlake Region in 1971. In 1972, he went to work for Howard Pawley Q.C., who was at that time the Member of the Legislative Assembly for Selkirk and the Attorney General of Manitoba, as his executive assistant.

In 1976, Sinclair continued his academic career at the University of Winnipeg, studying sociology and history. He then attended law school at the Faculty of Law at the University of Manitoba, and graduated in 1979, having won the A.J. Christie Prize, awarded to the top student in litigation, in his second year of legal studies.

Sinclair also spent his teenage years as an air cadet with #6 Jim Whitecross Royal Canadian Air Cadet Squadron.

== Legal career ==
Sinclair was called to the Manitoba Bar in 1980. Over the course of his legal practice, Sinclair practised primarily in the fields of Civil and Criminal Litigation, Human Rights law, and Indigenous Law. He represented a cross-section of clients but was known for his representation of Indigenous people and his knowledge of Indigenous legal issues, having taught courses on Indigenous People and the Law in the Department of Native Studies at the University of Manitoba since 1981. Sinclair also served as legal counsel for the First Nations of Manitoba, representing them in the areas of land claims, legislative initiatives, funding negotiations and the negotiation of Child Welfare Agreements following the release of the Kimelman Report into Child Welfare in Manitoba. Sinclair acted as legal counsel for the Manitoba Human Rights Commission. He was also an adjunct professor of law and an adjunct professor in the Faculty of Graduate Studies at the University of Manitoba.

Sinclair was appointed associate chief judge of the Provincial Court of Manitoba in March 1988, becoming the first Indigenous judge in the province.

As associate chief judge, Sinclair was appointed co-commissioner, along with Court of Queen's Bench Associate Chief Justice A. C. Hamilton, of Manitoba's Public Inquiry into the Administration of Justice and Aboriginal (Indigenous) People (The Aboriginal Justice Inquiry). The AJI report was an extensive study of issues plaguing the relationship between Indigenous people in Manitoba and the justice system and had a significant impact on law and legal policy in Canada.

In November 2000, Sinclair completed the "Report of the Pediatric Cardiac Surgery Inquest", a study into the deaths of twelve children in the pediatric cardiac surgery program of the Winnipeg Health Sciences Centre in 1994. That report led to significant changes in pediatric cardiac surgery in Manitoba and the study of medical and systemic errors in Canada.

He was appointed to the Court of Queen's Bench of Manitoba in January 2001 and was the province's first Indigenous person to be appointed a judge on that court. While a judge of that court, Justice Sinclair was asked to chair Canada's Truth and Reconciliation Commission (TRC), a request he initially declined due to the expected emotional toll. When the initial TRC chair resigned and the other commissioners were replaced, Sinclair was asked, and agreed, to reconsider. In 2009, he was appointed as its chair, on the condition that the decision-making process switch from voting to consensus.

After the TRC completed its final report in 2015, Sinclair announced his retirement from the bench and his intention to withdraw from public life. He was asked by leaders of Manitoba's Indigenous community to allow them to nominate him for an appointment to Canada’s Senate, and with the support of his family, he agreed. He was appointed as a senator from Manitoba in April 2016. Since being appointed to the Senate, Sinclair helped form the Independent Senators Group and sat on the Senate Standing Committees on Aboriginal/Indigenous Peoples, Fisheries and Oceans, Legal and Constitutional issues, Rules, Ethics and Conflicts of Interest.

He also acted as a mediator, made numerous public appearances on matters relating to Indigenous issues and the Senate of Canada, and was asked to investigate the role of the Police Services Board of Thunder Bay, Ontario, in the light of allegations of systemic racism in policing in that community. That report was completed in October 2018.

Sinclair retired from the Senate in 2021. As of 2022, Sinclair worked as a lawyer at Winnipeg law firm Cochrane Saxberg.

== Truth and Reconciliation Commission ==
Sinclair was appointed the chair of Canada's Indian Residential Schools Truth and Reconciliation Commission in June 2009. The commission's mandate stemmed from the terms of the Indian Residential Schools Settlement Agreement as a means by which residential school survivors and former staff could inform all Canadians about what happened in Indian residential schools and document the accounts of survivors, former staff, families, communities and anyone personally affected by the Indian residential schools experience.

The TRC held hundreds of public and private hearings throughout Canada and documented over 6,000 statements of survivors and more than 200 from former staff, all of which led to the commission's massive multi-volume final report released on December 15, 2015. The report documented the history of residential schools in Canada, noting that the Government of Canada had legally mandated the forcible removal of children from their parents, families and communities to separate them from their cultural influence. The schools were established to force Indigenous children to stop speaking their unique languages or following their unique cultural beliefs and practices and to adopt Euro-Canadian cultures and languages. This major finding of the report – that Canada established and maintained its forcible removal and residential school policy for the primary purpose of eliminating Indigenous cultures and racial identity – led to its conclusion that Canada had committed cultural genocide.

The report also noted that the government refused to include in the settlement agreement schools that Indigenous children were sent to by direction of the government but that were managed by the church or other organizations, as well as schools that had been established in Newfoundland and Labrador before it entered into Confederation in 1949. The report called upon Canada to address that issue quickly and collaboratively.

The report contained 94 Calls to Action and called upon all parts of Canadian society to commit to reconciliation and build a more respectful relationship between Indigenous and non-Indigenous people. Sinclair wrote: “…[R]econciliation is not an Indigenous problem. It is a Canadian one. It is one in which all Canadians are implicated.”

In his final speech at the release of the summary of the commission’s report on June 2, 2015, Sinclair acknowledged that reconciliation was going to be difficult. Perhaps, more difficult than getting at the truth behind residential schools, but it had to be done. He addressed all of Canada when he stated, “We have described for you a mountain. We have shown you the way to the top. We call upon you to do the climbing.”

== Personal life ==
Sinclair was a Fourth Degree Midewiwin member of the Three Fires Society, a traditional Ojibwe medicine society of great significance to the Ojibwe people.

Sinclair's traditional Ojibwe name was Mizanay Gheezhik, meaning "the One Who Speaks of Pictures in the Sky". He was named by Traditional Ojibwe Teacher and Elder Onaubinisay (Jim Dumont).

Sinclair had two children (including son Niigaan Sinclair) from his first marriage to Jeanette Warren. He was later married to Katherine Morrisseau-Sinclair (1955–2024) and they had a daughter. Additionally, the Sinclair family adopted two daughters into the family.

Sinclair served on numerous community boards including The Jemima Centre for the Handicapped, Scouts Canada, The John Howard Society, The Royal Canadian Air Cadets, The Canadian Club, The Canadian Native Law Students Association, The Canadian Indian Lawyers Association (now the Indigenous Bar Association), The Social Planning Council of Winnipeg, the Ma Mawi Wi Chi Itata Centre, AbinochiZhawaynDakooziwin Ojibway Immersion Nursery School Board, the Selkirk Friendship Centre, the Manitoba Provincial Judges Association, the Manitoba Bar Association, the National Judicial Institute and the board of regents of the University of Winnipeg.

== Death ==
“Peacefully and surrounded by love” from his family, Sinclair died in Winnipeg after battling congestive heart failure and subsequently being hospitalized over the past few months. Sinclair died at St. Boniface Hospital in Winnipeg, on November 4, 2024, at the age of 73. He was interred at Glen Eden Cemetery in Winnipeg.

== Honours ==
- In 2016, Murray Sinclair was honoured with a 'Peace Patron Award' by The Mosaic Institute, an NGO based in Toronto working to promote pluralism reducing conflict in Canada and abroad.
- Sinclair was awarded the A. J. Christie Prize in Civil Litigation in his second year of law, and articled with a law firm in his hometown.
- He was awarded a National Aboriginal Achievement Award, now the Indspire Awards, in the field of Justice in 1994, and for Lifetime Achievement in 2017.
- He received 20 honorary degrees for his work in the field of Aboriginal justice.
- Other awards and honours include the Mahatma Gandhi Prize for Peace from the Gandhi Foundation, Canada's World Peace Award (2016) from the World Federalist Movement-Canada, the Mandela Award, the Tarnopolski Award for Human Rights from the International Federation of Jurists (2017) and the Meritorious Service Cross for his service on the Truth and Reconciliation Commission of Canada and the Order of Canada in 2022
- In 2019, Murray Sinclair was awarded as the 2019 Symons Medal recipient. This medal is awarded to individuals who make exceptional contributions to Canadian life and is presented annually at the Confederation Centre of the Arts located in Prince Edward Island, Canada. Murray Sinclair was awarded the 2019 Symon's Medal on November 1, 2019. Murray Sinclair was awarded this medal due to his service with the justice system in Manitoba for over 25 years, being the second Indigenous Judge to be appointed in Canada and the first Indigenous Judge in Manitoba, and finally serving as the Chief Commissioner of the Truth and Reconciliation Commission (TRC) in Canada.
- In 2024, Sinclair was appointed a member of the Order of Manitoba and designated King's Counsel.
