= National Centre for Truth and Reconciliation =

Canadian archive of residential schools history

- Centre national pour la vérité et la réconciliation
- Location: Chancellor’s Hall, 177 Dysart Road, University of Manitoba, Winnipeg, Canada
- Type: Academic, Indigenous, community

Other information
- Budget: $2.8 million
- Director: Stephanie Scott
- Employees: 22
- Website: nctr.ca

The National Centre for Truth and Reconciliation (NCTR; French: Centre national pour la vérité et la réconciliation, CNVR) is the archival repository for all of the material collected by the Truth and Reconciliation Commission of Canada, purposed to compile the complete history and legacy of Canada's residential school system.

== History ==
The National Centre for Truth and Reconciliation was created as part of the 2007 Indian Residential Schools Settlement Agreement, which dictated that a permanent archive would be established to contain the records of the Truth and Reconciliation Commission (TRC). The Centre contains all of the residential school survivor testimony, archival documents, and other materials collected by the TRC from 2009 to 2015. The holdings include millions of church and government records, hundreds of residential school photographs, and over 7,000 survivor statements collected by the TRC.

The NCTR opened in the fall of 2015 in Winnipeg, on the campus of the University of Manitoba. The digital archive portion of the NCTR opened to the public on 3 November 2015. In December 2016, the Government of Canada allocated CA$10 million to the ongoing operations of the NCTR. In September 2019, the NCTR was added to the UNESCO Canada Memory of the World Register.

== Organization ==
The NCTR is intended to be a repository for the complete history and legacy of the residential school system, with the goal of teaching Canadians about this history.

=== Governance ===
The NCTR is governed by an administrative agreement between the TRC and the University of Manitoba. The Centre is overseen by a seven-member governing circle, composed of three Survivors, two representatives from the University of Manitoba, and two members from partner organizations. The NCTR is also overseen by a Survivor Circle, which includes First Nations, Métis, and Inuit survivors of the residential school system from across Canada.

=== Collections ===
Under the Indian Residential Schools Settlement Agreement, religious and government bodies involved in the operations of the residential schools were legally required to submit all relevant residential school records to the TRC, which would then be transferred to the NCTR. In 2018, it came to light that the NCTR was still waiting on over 3,000 photographs and numerous boxes of litigation material to be submitted from the Grey Nuns of Montreal.

=== Programming ===
The NCTR is engaged in a range of educational and research programming related to residential schools, healing, and reconciliation. Ongoing programming includes:

- "Imagine a Canada," a national art and essay program engaging Canadian youth in thinking about what reconciliation can look like.
- "Lessons from the Indian Residential School Settlement Agreement," an initiative seeking input and feedback from survivors on their experiences with the settlement agreement, and to foster discussion about what worked and didn't work with the agreement process.

On 30 September 2019, to coincide with Orange Shirt Day, the NCTR released in ceremony a memorial register that documents the 4,037 students who died while attending residential schools across Canada. The creation of this register was in response to the Truth and Reconciliation Commission of Canada's final report and calls to action, which included a directive to create a register to document and honour those who died at residential school. At the time of release, the NCTR noted that the register was not complete and that many names of students who died are still unknown.

== See also ==
- Canadian Indian residential school system
- Indigenous peoples in Canada
