= Truth and Reconciliation Commission of Canada =

2008–2015 investigation of Indian residential schools

- Commission de vérité et réconciliation du Canada

Agency overview
- Formed: June 2, 2008
- Dissolved: December 18, 2015
- Superseding agency: National Centre for Truth and Reconciliation
- Type: Truth and reconciliation commission
- Jurisdiction: Government of Canada
- Headquarters: Winnipeg, Manitoba, Canada
- Agency executive: Murray Sinclair, chief commissioner
- Key document: Indian Residential Schools Settlement Agreement
- Website: www.trc.ca

The Truth and Reconciliation Commission of Canada (TRC) (Note: French: Commission de vérité et réconciliation du Canada [CVR]) was a truth and reconciliation commission active in Canada from 2008 to 2015, organized by the parties of the Indian Residential Schools Settlement Agreement.

The commission was officially established on June 1, 2008, with the purpose of documenting the history and lasting impacts of the Canadian Indian residential school system on Indigenous (Note: Indigenous has been capitalized in keeping with the style guide of the Government of Canada. The capitalization also aligns with the style used within the final report of the Truth and Reconciliation Commission of Canada and the United Nations Declaration on the Rights of Indigenous Peoples. In the Canadian context, Indigenous is capitalized when discussing peoples, cultures, or communities in the same way European or Canadian is used to refer to non-Indigenous topics or people.) students and their families. It provided residential school survivors (Note: Survivor is the term used in the final report of the TRC and the Statement of apology to former students of Indian Residential Schools issued by Stephen Harper on behalf of the Government of Canada in 2008.) an opportunity to share their experiences during public and private meetings held across the country. The TRC emphasizes that it has a priority of displaying the impacts of the residential schools to the Canadians who have been kept in the dark from these matters.

In June 2015, the TRC released an executive summary of its findings along with 94 "calls to action" regarding reconciliation between Canadians and Indigenous Peoples. The commission officially concluded in December 2015 with the publication of a multi-volume final report that concluded the school system amounted to cultural genocide. The National Centre for Truth and Reconciliation, which opened at the University of Manitoba in November 2015, is an archival repository home to the research, documents, and testimony collected during the course of the TRC's operation.

== Background ==
They Came for the Children, published by the Truth and Reconciliation Commission

The TRC was established in June 2008 as one of the mandated aspects of the Indian Residential Schools Settlement Agreement (IRSSA). As part of the negotiated IRSSA, a $60 million budget over five years was established for the work of the TRC to take place. A one-year extension was granted in January 2014 to allow for the completion of the TRC's mandate, extending the conclusion of the commission to June 2015.

The commission was founded as an arms-length organization with a mandate of documenting the history and impacts of the residential school system. About 70 percent of the schools were administered, with government funds, by the Catholic Church. As explained in the 2013 Spring Report of the Auditor General of Canada, a key part of the TRC mandate included "creating as complete a historical record as possible of the residential school system and legacy." It was also tasked with preserving collected records documenting the residential school system and those created over the course of the commission's work for future management at a national research centre. While undertaking this task the TRC spent six years travelling to different parts of Canada to hear the testimony of more than 6,500 witnesses including residential school survivors and others impacted by the school system.

The mandate of the TRC included hosting seven national reconciliation events, collecting all relevant archival documents relating to the residential schools from church and government bodies, collecting statements from survivors, and overseeing a commemoration fund to support community reconciliation events. The TRC's mandate emphasized preserving and exposing the true history of residential schools.

In March 2008, Indigenous leaders and church officials embarked on a multi-city Remembering the Children tour to promote activities of the Truth and Reconciliation Commission. On January 21–22, 2008, the King's University College of Edmonton, Alberta, held an interdisciplinary studies conference on the subject of the Truth and Reconciliation Committee. On June 11 of the same year, Prime Minister Stephen Harper apologized for the role of past governments in administration of the residential schools. Later, in 2017, Prime Minister Justin Trudeau also vocalized an apology to those who were victims of the residential schools.

The commission's mandate was originally scheduled to end in 2014, with a final event in Ottawa. However, it was extended to 2015 as numerous records related to residential schools were provided to the commission in 2014 by Library and Archives Canada following a January 2013 order of the Ontario Superior Court of Justice. The commission needed additional time to review these documents. The commission held its closing event in Ottawa from May 31 to June 3, 2015, including a ceremony at Rideau Hall with Governor General David Johnston.

=== Testimonies ===
The mandate of IRSSA required the TRC to gather testimonies from the residential school's survivors. The testimonies were claimed to be necessary in order for the mandate to create a historical record of the legacy and impacts of the residential schools. The historical record was also important in educating the public on "the truth of what happened" in Canada. The records of the testimonies and documents of the residential schools are open to the public in a National Research Centre.

Between 2008 and 2014 the TRC gathered what is estimated to be around 7000 testimonies from the survivors, most from those who had attended the schools after the 1940s. The testimonies were gathered in both public and private settings, such as community hearings, sharing circles, Commissioners Sharing Panels, etc. The Commissioners Panels often brought large audiences, drawing hundreds of audience members and reporters with testimonies regularly being recorded and posted online. During the public testimonies, survivors detailed their experiences surrounding the residential schools. These regularly consisted of memories of being stripped of their language and culture as well as experiences of abuse, sexual assault and malnutrition.

=== Commission name ===
The Canadian Truth and Reconciliation Commission (TRC) was named in a similar fashion to the commission by the same name in South Africa in 1996 and was similar in function to that of Chile in 1990. In this context, reconciliation refers to the act of restoring a once harmonious relationship. The commission came under criticism for using the term in their name, however, as it implies that there was once a harmonious relationship between settlers and Indigenous Peoples that is being restored, while that relationship may never have existed in Canada. The use of reconciliation thereby perpetuates such myth by continuing to deny "the existence of pre-contact Aboriginal sovereignty."

=== Commissioners ===
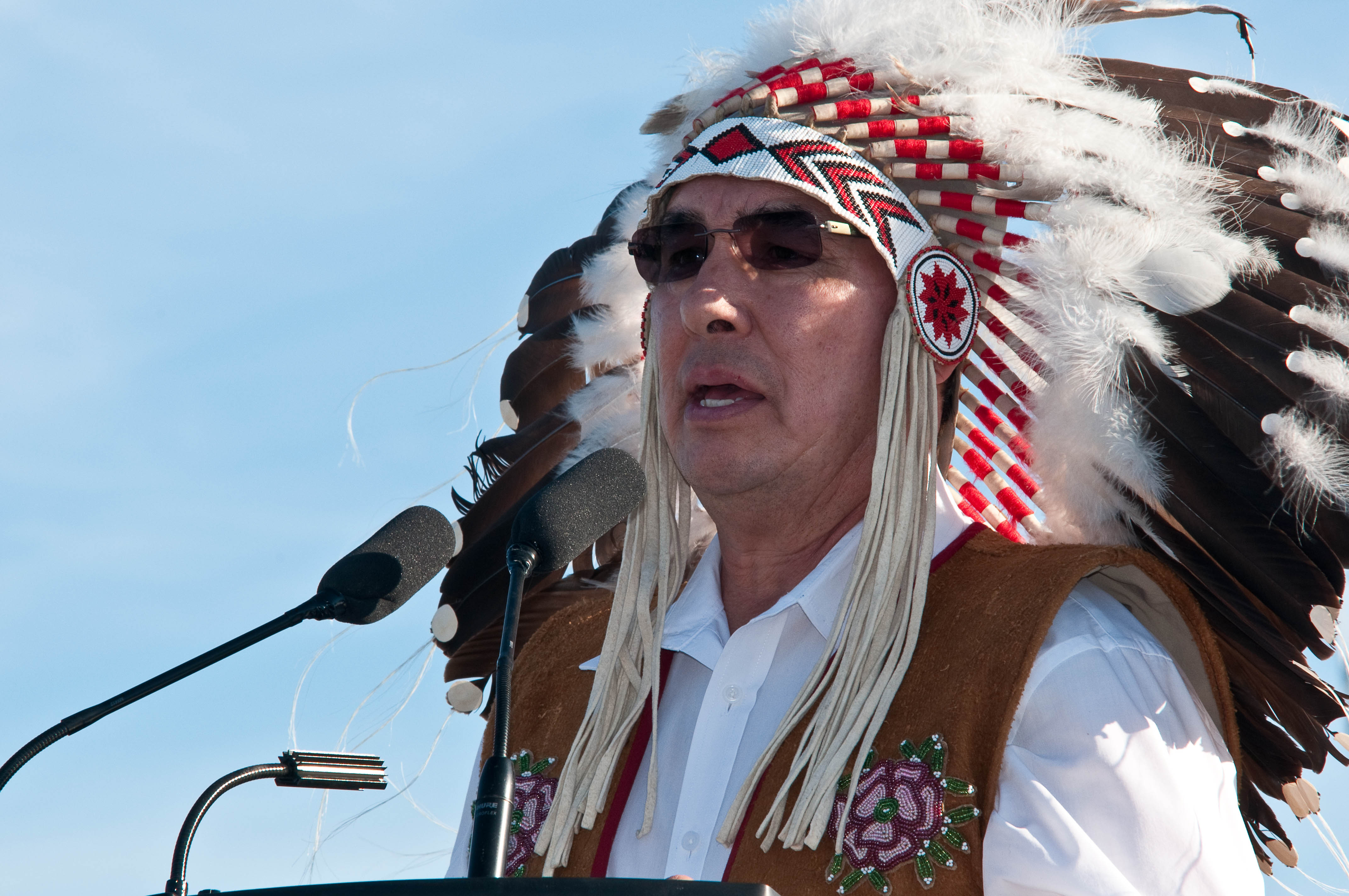
Commissioner Littlechild speaking at a TRC event in Inuvik, 2011

Justice Harry S. Laforme of the Ontario Court of Appeal was named to chair the commission. He resigned on October 20, 2008, citing insubordination by the two other commissioners, Claudette Dumont-Smith and Jane Brewin Morley. Laforme said they wanted to focus primarily on uncovering and documenting truth while he wanted to also have an emphasis on reconciliation between aboriginal and non-aboriginal Canadians. In addition: "The two commissioners are unprepared to accept that the structure of the commission requires that the commission's course is to be charted and its objectives are to be shaped ultimately through the authority and leadership of its chair." Although Dumont-Smith and Morley denied the charge and initially stayed on, both resigned in January 2009.

On June 10, 2009, Murray Sinclair was appointed to replace Laforme as chairperson of the TRC. Marie Wilson, a senior executive with the Workers' Safety and Compensation Commission of the Northwest Territories and Nunavut, and Wilton Littlechild, former Conservative Member of Parliament and Alberta regional chief for the Assembly of First Nations, were appointed to replace commissioners Dumont-Smith and Morley.

Sandy White Hawk, a Sicangu Lakota adoptee from the Rosebud Reservation, South Dakota Honorary Witness of the Truth and Reconciliation Commission on Residential Schools in Canada.

=== Missing Children Project ===
The TRC contributed to not only educating the public about the reality of the residential schools, but also led to creating organizations such as the Missing Children Project. Over the course of the residential schools, thousands of children died as a result of diseases, suicide, malnutrition, etc. In 1917, the death rates stopped from being documented by the Department of Indian Affairs. The Missing Children Project is an organization that is dedicated to identifying the children who died during their time at the residential schools. The documentation is done through intensive research as well as analyzing the different conditions the students were facing.

== Calls to action ==
In June 2015, the TRC released a summary report of its findings and "94 Calls to Action" to "redress the legacy of residential schools and advance the process of Canadian reconciliation." The calls to action were divided into two categories: "Legacy" and "Reconciliation."

=== Legacy ===
The Legacy section of the calls to action focused on redressing the harms resulting from the Indian residential schools (IRS), the proposed actions are identified in the following sub-categories:

1. Child welfare: Residential schools often served as foster homes rather than educational settings. According to a 1953 survey, 4,313 children of 10,112 residential school children were described as either orphans or originated from broken homes. The sole residential school in Canada's Atlantic Provinces, in Shubenacadie, Nova Scotia, was one such school, taking in children whom child welfare agencies believed to be at risk. There is an ongoing legacy of state intervention in Indigenous children lives via the child welfare system. By 2011, 3.6 percent of all First Nations children under the age of 14 were in foster care, compared to 0.3 percent for non-lndigenous children. In 2012, the United Nations Committee on the Rights of the Child voiced concern on Canada's removal of Indigenous children from their families as a 'first resort'.
2. Education: Due to limited funds, a shortage of trained teachers, and an emphasis on manual labour, many students in the IRS system did not progress beyond a rudimentary education. When residential schools were phased out, Indigenous youth enrolled in provincial schools dropped out in large numbers. The education focused calls to action are to address the current school completion rates and the income gap between Indigenous and non-Indigenous students. In addition, the calls to actions request the elimination of the ongoing discrepancy in funding of Indigenous education.
3. Language and Culture: Children in residential schools were not allowed to speak their native languages or practice their culture. According to UNESCO, 36 percent of Canada's Indigenous languages are listed as being critically endangered. The calls to action request increased funding for educating children in Indigenous languages and also request that post-secondary institutions provide degrees and diplomas in Indigenous languages.
4. Health: Healthcare for IRS students varied considerably between schools and between different decades. After the 1940s, health facilities and health care workers became more prevalent. Some schools had a nurse on staff and an infirmary, with doctors who paid visits. Testimony before the TRC reveals that a great many children were subjected to sexual and physical abuse while attending a residential school. It is often claimed that the effects of the trauma have been passed on to the children of those students. The calls to action in this connection connect the poor healthcare provided at residential school to the current gap in health outcomes for Indigenous people in Canada.
5. Justice: When the Canadian legal system was tasked with investigating abuse claims, few prosecutions resulted from police investigations. In many cases, the federal government and the RCMP compromised the investigations. Given the statutes of limitations, many acts of abuse have gone unpunished because the children did not have the means or possess the knowledge to seek justice for their abuses. The calls to action around justice seek to extend the statutes of limitations and to reaffirm the independence of the RCMP. They also speak to the need to develop culturally appropriate justice systems.

=== Reconciliation ===
The Reconciliation section of the calls to action were focused on creating better relations between the federal and provincial governments of Canada and Indigenous nations, with an emphasis on creating a reconciled relationship. The proposed actions are identified in the following sub-categories:

1. Canadian governments and the United Nations Declaration on the Rights of Indigenous People
2. Royal proclamation and covenant of reconciliation
3. Settlement agreement parties and the United Nations Declaration on the Rights of Indigenous Peoples
4. Equity for Aboriginal people in the legal system
5. National council for reconciliation
6. Professional development and training for public servants
7. Church apologies and reconciliation
8. Education for reconciliation
9. Youth programs
10. Museums and archives
11. Missing children and burial information
12. National centre for truth and reconciliation
13. Commemoration
14. Media and reconciliation
15. Sports and reconciliation
16. Business and reconciliation
17. Newcomers to Canada

=== Implementation ===
The degree of implementation has been assessed differently by observers. Two of the most prominent asessements are conducted by the Yellowhead Institute at Ryerson University (now Toronto Metropolitan University) and the Canadian Broadcasting Corporation (CBC). The government also conducted their own assessment.

==== Yellowhead Institute assessment ====
In 2016 and 2017, historian Ian Mosby evaluated how many of the calls to action had been completed at the first and second anniversary marks. In 2016, he concluded that only five calls were complete and three calls were partially complete, leaving 86 calls unmet. In 2017, his evaluation showed that only 7 of the 94 calls had been completed. At the end of 2020, his evaluation (together with Eva Jewell) is that only 8 calls had been fully implemented.

==== CBC assessment ====
In 2018 the Canadian Broadcasting Corporation established Beyond 94, a website to track the status of each call to action. As of March 2018, 10 were marked as completed, 15 were in-progress with projects underway, 25 had projects proposed, and 44 were unmet. As of July 29, 2019, the site has been updated to mark 10 calls to action completed, 21 in-progress with projects underway, 37 in-progress with projects proposed, and 26 "not yet started."

As of May 10, 2025, the CBC has marked the following 15 calls to action as "complete":

Call to action	Implementation
Language and Culture (#13) — Acknowledge that Aboriginal rights include Aboriginal language rights	In 2017, the Minister for Heritage Mélanie Joly announced, in collaboration with the Assembly of First Nations, the Inuit Tapiriit Kanatami, and the Métis National Council, that they would be co-developing an Indigenous Languages Act for the protection and promotion of Indigenous languages across Indigenous, Metis, and Inuit cultures. The Indigenous Languages Act became law on June 21, 2019.
Language and Culture (#15) — Appoint an Aboriginal Languages Commissioner	Ronald Ignace was appointed commissioner on June 14, 2021, along with three other directors, to form the Office of the Commissioner of Indigenous Languages.
Language and Culture (#16) — Create university and college degree and diploma programs in Aboriginal languages	Many university courses in Indigenous languages are available, included in larger Indigenous studies programs in universities and colleges. Some institutions offer degree or diploma programs in Indigenous languages.
Justice (#39) — Collect and publish data on the criminal victimization of Aboriginal people	Statistics Canada published a report in 2016 entitled Victimization of Aboriginal people in Canada, 2014 utilizing data from the 2014 General Social Survey. The report found that higher levels of Indigenous Canadians were found to have been victims of crime in 2014 than non-Indigenous Canadians.
Justice (#41) — Appoint a public inquiry into the causes of, and remedies for, the disproportionate victimization of Aboriginal women and girls	Main article: National Inquiry into Missing and Murdered Indigenous Women and Girls In the immediate aftermath of the 2015 federal election, the new Trudeau government announced a national inquiry into missing and murdered indigenous women and girls. The inquiry commenced in 2016, and concluded on June 3, 2019, and included numerous recommendations for addressing the "endemic violence" faced by Indigenous women in Canada.
Reconciliation (#53) — Establish a National Council for Reconciliation	Bill C-29 established the National Council for Reconciliation, which provides oversight over long-term progress towards reconciliation.
Reconciliation (#59) — Church parties to residential school settlement to educate congregations on why apologies necessary	67 percent of residential schools were run by the Catholic Church, with the remaining 33 percent including the Anglican, United, and Presbyterian Church. These churches began to apologize beginning with the United Church of Canada in 1986, with the others following in the years thereafter. In 2009, the Vatican issued an official expression of sorrow, and Justin Trudeau requested that an official apology be made in 2017. The Truth and Reconciliation Commission called on all churches involved in the facilitation of the Indian Residential Schools to educate their congregations about the church's involvement in the schools and the impacts of colonialism on Indigenous Peoples. This is done primarily through KAIROS Canada, a faith-based advocacy group. In July 2022, Pope Francis apologized for "the evil committed by so many Christians".
Reconciliation (#67) — A national review of museum policies and best practices	The Canadian Museums Association released a report in 2022 with ten recommendations relating to adopting the United Nations Declaration on the Rights of Indigenous Peoples.
Reconciliation (#70) — A national review of archival policies	The Association of Canadian Archivists released a "Reconciliation Framework" in 2022.
Reconciliation (#80) — Establish a National Day for Truth and Reconciliation as a statutory holiday	Main article: National Day for Truth and Reconciliation Bill C-5 was passed on June 3, 2021, to make Orange Shirt Day (September 30) a statutory holiday
Reconciliation (#83) — Canada Council for the Arts to establish a strategy for Indigenous and non-Indigenous artists to undertake collaborative projects	The Canadian Council for the Arts gave $17.8 million in funds to Indigenous artists in 2017–18, and is on track to triple its 2015-16 investment of $6.3 million to $18.9 million in 2020–21, as detailed in their 2016-2021 Strategic Plan.
Reconciliation (#84) — Restore and increase funding to the CBC/Radio-Canada to enable it to support reconciliation	The federal government allotted an additional 75 million dollars towards the CBC in its 2016 budget. The CBC presented an "Accountability Plan" to make public how those funds were being invested. Though the commission called specifically for increased Indigenous programming, under the Broadcasting Act it is impossible for public funds to be put towards specific programming. However, the amount of programming by and for Indigenous Peoples has increased on the CBC since 2016.
Reconciliation (#85) — Aboriginal Peoples Television Network (APTN) to support reconciliation	The commission called on APTN to produce and broadcast content by and for Indigenous peoples supporting reconciliation. This initiative was upheld by APTN, with the launch of their series TAKEN in 2016 centring on missing and murdered Indigenous women and girls.
Reconciliation (#88) — Continued support for the North American Indigenous Games	The Canadian government promised in 2017 to contribute $18.9 million to funding "culturally relevant" sports programs in Indigenous communities over 5 years, with 5.5 million promised every 4 years after 2022, as a collaboration between the Ministry of Sport and Persons with Disabilities and the Ministry of Indigenous and Northern Affairs.
Reconciliation (#94) — Replace the Oath of Citizenship	Further information: Oath of Citizenship (Canada) § Recognition of Indigenous peoples The Oath of Citzienship was changed in 2021 to recognize indigenous people.

As of May 10, 2025, the CBC has marked the following 24 calls to action as "in progress":

Call to action	Implementation
Child Welfare (#3) —Implement Jordan's Principle	As of June 2025, the backlog of requests relating to Jordan's Principle is roughly 140,000.
Child Welfare (#4) — Enact child welfare legislation that establishes national standards for Aboriginal child apprehension and custody cases	
Education (#7) — Eliminate educational and employment gaps	
Education (#12) — Develop culturally appropriate early childhood education programs	In 2018, the federal government published the Indigenous Early Learning and Child Care Framework.
Language and Culture (#14) — Enact an Aboriginal Language Act	In 2019, the Indigenous Languages Act was passed by the Parliament of Canada. It was criticized for lacking in enforceable rights, for excessive reporting requirements, and for lacking in specific protections for Inuit language. The Office of the Commissioner for Indigenous Languages was criticized for its continuity with the Aboriginal Languages Initiative.
Language and Culture (#17) — Waive administrative costs for five years for revision of official identity documents	The federal government announced that it would waive the costs of changing names for 5 years from 2021 to 2026.
Health (#20) — Recognize, respect, and address the distinct health needs of the Métis, Inuit, and off-reserve Aboriginal peoples	
Health (#21) — Provide sustainable funding for existing and new Aboriginal healing centres	In 2019, the federal government announced the construction of a new territorial treatment centre in Nunavut.
Health (#22) — Recognize the value of Aboriginal healing practices and use them in the treatment of Aboriginal patients	
Justice (#36) — Provide culturally relevant services to inmates on issues such as substance abuse, family and domestic violence	In 2017, the federal government implemented the Indigenous Community Corrections Initiative. In 2023, the federal government announced an additional CA$5,000,000 would be spent on the initiative.
Justice (#40) — Create adequately funded and accessible Aboriginal-specific victim programs and services	In March 2025, the federal government implemented the inaugural Indigenous Justice Strategy.
Reconciliation (#43) — Adopt and implement the United Nations Declaration on the Rights of Indigenous Peoples	Main article: United Nations Declaration on the Rights of Indigenous Peoples Act (Canada) Bill C-15 was passed on June 16, 2021, in its third attempt at being passed in parliament.
Reconciliation (#44) — Develop a national plan, strategies and other concrete measures to achieve the goals of the UNDRIP	Main article: United Nations Declaration on the Rights of Indigenous Peoples Act (Canada)
Reconciliation (#47) — Governments to repudiate Doctrine of Discovery and terra nullius and reform laws that rely on such concepts	The Vatican rescinded the Doctrine of Discovery in April 2023. The United Nations Declaration on the Rights of Indigenous Peoples Act contains language repudiating the Doctrine of Discovery and terra nullius.
Reconciliation (#62) — Develop and fund Aboriginal content in education	
Reconciliation (#72) — Develop and maintain the National Residential School Student Death Register created by the TRC	In 2019, the federal government announced it would spend CA$33,800,000 over 3 years to develop and maintain the National Residential School Student Death Register and an online registry of residential school cemeteries.
Reconciliation (#73) — Establish and maintain an online registry of residential school cemeteries	In 2019, the federal government committed to spending CA$33,800,000 on maintaining a register of residential school cemeteries.
Reconciliation (#77) —Archives to provide residential school records to National Centre for Truth and Reconciliation	In 2022, the federal government and the National Centre for Truth and Reconciliation (NCTR) reached a memorandum of agreement to allow for more than 875,000 documents to be given by the federal government to the NCTR.
Reconciliation (#78) — Commit to funding of $10 million over seven years to the National Centre for Truth and Reconciliation	In December 2016, the federal government announced that the National Centre for Truth and Reconciliation would receive CA$10,000,000 over 7 years.
Reconciliation (#79) — Develop a reconciliation framework for Canadian heritage and commemoration	In 2022, the federal government tabled a new Historic Places of Canada Act which would have created three new positions - one representative for each of First Nations, Métis, and Inuit. Certain former residential school buildings have been designated as national historic sites.
Reconciliation (#81) — Commission and install a Residential Schools National Monument in Ottawa	A residential schools monument is to be built on Parliament Hill.
Reconciliation (#82) — Commission and install a Residential Schools Monument in each capital city	Several provincial and territorial capital cities have permanent residential schools monuments or are building such monuments: 1. Toronto opened the Spirit Garden at Nathan Phillips Square in 2024.; 2. The Saskatchewan Residential School Memorial opened in Regina in June 2022, and interpretative panels were opened in 2024.; 3. The Reconciliation Garden opened in Edmonton in 2022.; 4. The Every Child Matters memorial garden opened in Winnipeg in 2023.; 5. A momnument for the survivors of Whitehorse Indian Mission School opened in 2018.; 6. Peace and Friendship Park opened in Halifax in July 2021.; 7. A Residential School Memorial Garden has been proposed in St. John's, Newfoundland and Labrador.; 8. In 2025, the Government of the Northwest Territories announcied that it was starting the consultation process on building a residential schools monument in Yellowknife.; 9. In 2024, the Government of British Columbia committed to building a residential schools memorial on the grounds of the legislature.
Reconciliation (#87) — Tell the stories of Aboriginal athletes in history	Canada's Sports Hall of Fame included a segment about Indigenous athletes throughout Canadian history in an online exhibit launched in 2017. This was followed by the inclusion of various Indigenous athletes into the British Columbia Hall of Fame, the Saskatchewan Sports Hall of Fame, and the Toronto Hockey Hall of Fame.
Reconciliation (#90) — Ensure that national sports policies, programs and initiatives are inclusive of Aboriginal Peoples	After the release of the commission's report in 2015, Sport Canada announced that it would be reinstating funding to the Aboriginal Sport Circle, which is a national organization advocating for resources for Indigenous, Metis, and Inuit athletic programs. The federal government also allocated CA$47,500,000 to sport development in over 300 communities nationwide.
Reconciliation (#93) — Revise the information kit for newcomers and citizenship test to reflect a more inclusive history of the Aboriginal Peoples of Canada	In 2021, the Ministry of Immigration, Refugees and Citizenship committed to updating the information kit and the citizenship test to reflect Indigenous people later that year. The information kit and citzienship test were not updated.

== Final report ==
In December 2015, the TRC released its final report. The report was based on primary and secondary source research undertaken by the commission and testimonies collected from residential school survivors during TRC events. The final report summarized the work of the TRC and included the following sections:

External videos
- 'Truth and Reconciliation Commission final report" (2017) – The National (4:29min)

- "Honouring the Truth, Reconciling the Future,"
- "What We Have Learned,"
- "The Survivors Speak,"
- "The History, Part 1 - Origins to 1939,"
- "The History, Part 2 - 1939 to 2000,"
- "The Inuit and Northern Experience,"
- "The Métis Experience,"
- "Missing Children and Unmarked Burials,"
- "The Legacy," and
- "Reconciliation."

The report noted that an estimated 150,000 children attended residential schools during its 120-year history and an estimated 3200 of those children died in the residential schools. From the 70,000 former IRS students still alive, there were 31,970 sexual or serious sexual assault cases resolved by Independent Assessment Process, and 5,995 claims were still in progress as of the report's release.

The TRC concluded that the removal of children from the influence of their own culture with the intent of assimilating them into the dominant Canadian culture amounted to cultural genocide. The ambiguity of the TRC's phrasing allowed for the interpretation that physical and biological genocide also occurred. The TRC was not authorized to conclude that physical and biological genocide occurred, as such a finding would imply a legal responsibility of the Canadian government that would be difficult to prove. As a result, the debate about whether the Canadian government also committed physical and biological genocide against Indigenous populations remains open.

The National Centre for Truth and Reconciliation (NCTR) was established at the University of Manitoba in Winnipeg, as an archive to hold the research, documents, and testimony collected by the TRC during its operation. The NCTR opened to the public in November 2015 and holds more than five million documents relating to the legacy of residential schools in Canada.

== Criticisms ==
A number of critiques about the TRC have been put forward by both Indigenous and non-Indigenous writers, ranging from its scope and motivating framework to its methodology and conclusions.

Professor Glen Coulthard, a member of the Yellowknives Dene First Nation, has argued that the TRC's focus on the residential school system positioned reconciliation as a matter of "overcoming a 'sad chapter' in [Canadian] history," which failed to recognize the ongoing nature and impact of colonialism. For Coulthard, reconciliation being tied solely to the residential school system and actions of the past explains why Prime Minister Stephen Harper was able to apologize for the system in 2008 and, a year later, claim that there is no history of colonialism in Canada. Professors Brian Rice, a member of the Mohawk Nation, and Anna Snyder agree with Coulthard's critique of the focus on residential schools as the singular issue to reconcile noting that the schools were only "one aspect of a larger project to absorb or assimilate Aboriginal people".

Many writers have observed the way the TRC historicizes the events of colonialism and fails to emphasize that uneven Indigenous-non-Indigenous relationships are perpetual and ongoing. Historicizing is further evident in the TRC's 'Principles of Reconciliation' where reconciliation is framed as grappling with harms of the past. This wrongly implies that colonialism is not ongoing and is not a continuing part of current government policy. Because of this historicizing, the TRC concentrated its efforts largely on 'psychological' healing through the gathering and airing of stories; however, it lacked significant institutional change, particularly change to the kinds of government institutions involved in residential schools and other forms of colonial domination.

Another criticism of the commission is that reconciliation is introduced "on terms still largely dictated by the state," rather than allowing a grassroots movement to gain traction or forms of 'moral protest' to develop. Because it was the government that initiated the process of reconciliation and set the terms of it, some critics argued that the colonial power is dictating the terms of their colonial subjects' healing, and "[imposing] a time limit on 'healing'", in order to move past; it makes it less effective as a platform for reconciliation. The approach by the commission to engage with Indigenous Peoples when and how it is most convenient for non-Indigenous Canadians can be seen as "yet another form of settler colonialism." Because Indigenous "recognition and reconciliation, from a Canadian perspective, [is] focused only on the wrongs of the past, and the situation as it exists today is ignored."

Unlike the Truth and Reconciliation Commission in South Africa, the Canadian commission was not a federal or state-led initiative. It was developed as part of a legal settlement, the Indian Residential School Settlement Agreement, between various residential school survivor groups, the Assembly of First Nations, various Church bodies, and the Government of Canada. As such, the TRC had no powers of subpoena; no power to offer known perpetrators of abuse the possibility of amnesty in exchange for honest testimony about any abuses that may have been committed. Further, the commission could not explicitly "name names" or accuse individuals; perpetrators held accountable via the commission. Therefore, the Canadian commission heard primarily from former students.

=== Questioning of findings ===
The same week the Final Report was released, two retired professors from the University of Manitoba published a scathing criticism titled "Truth and Reconciliation report tells a 'skewed and partial story' of residential schools". Hymie Rubenstein, a retired professor of anthropology and Rodney A. Clifton, former residential school employee in the 1960s, co-penned an editorial questioning the truthfulness of the Report. In it, they held that, while the residential school program had been harmful to many students, the commission had shown "indifference to robust evidence gathering, comparative or contextual data, and cause-effect relationships," which resulted in the commission's report telling "a skewed and partial story".

According to Rubenstein and Clifton, the Truth and Reconciliation Report did not compare its findings with rates and causes of mortality among Aboriginal and non-Aboriginal children attending public schools. Rubenstein and Clifton noted that the report also failed to consider Indian residential schools were typically located in rural areas far from hospitals, making treatment more difficult to acquire. They describe it as "bad research".

In an essay defending John A. Macdonald from the claim of having committed genocide, Patrice Dutil, a professor of politics and public administration at Ryerson University (now Toronto Metropolitan University), claimed that the commission was "yet another very expensive prise de conscience designed to keep the light on a painful aspect of the Canadian experience", and that the volumes on residential schools "barely pretends to be an academic document." He went on to claim that "The study makes no attempt to put things in perspective, to show how practices evolved or to compare the Canadian experience with that of other countries. It is, rather, a blunt catalogue of findings typical of Royal Commissions, providing a long list of mini-studies of various phenomena with scarcely an academic veneer."

In March 2017, Lynn Beyak, a Conservative member of the Senate Standing Committee of Aboriginal Peoples, voiced disapproval of the final TRC report, claiming that it had omitted an "abundance of good" that she thought was present in the schools. Her comments were widely criticized, including by Minister of Indigenous and Northern Affairs Carolyn Bennett and leader of the New Democratic Party Tom Mulcair, though some Conservative senators claimed her opinions were an expression of free speech. The Anglican Church also raised concerns, stating in a release co-signed by bishops Fred Hiltz and Mark MacDonald: "There was nothing good about children going missing and no report being filed. There was nothing good about burying children in unmarked graves far from their ancestral homes." In response, the Conservative Party leadership removed Beyak from the Senate committee underscoring that her comments did not align with the views of the party.

In July 2021, a group of historians and other scholars published 'From Truth Comes Reconciliation: An Assessment of the Truth and Reconciliation Report', criticising the Final Report for the 'under-valuing of positive testimonies' and that "good historical practices were often overlooked in the Report, resulting in a work of passionate and reckless advocacy that set out to convince Canadians that—despite evidence of good intentions, student successes, and many dedicated educators—what had taken place was a set of atrocities, of three kinds of genocide."

According to Gerry Bowler, Professor Emeritus of History at the University of Manitoba, "Perhaps the TRC Final Report was never meant to be a work of real history. Though some fine academic work was done in the archives, the TRC Report follows few of the rules of the discipline", and concludes:

So, is the Final Report of the Truth and Reconciliation Commission good history? No, it is not; it fails at a fundamental level. No undergraduate student would be allowed to get away with making extraordinary claims without backing them up by reference to their sources. Far too often, we are told of genocide or other atrocities without so much as a single footnote to indicate the basis of the conclusion … The [report’s] conclusions were overtly determined from the investigation, testimonies were made in violation of the canons of oral history, many of the authors saw themselves as crusaders righting ancient wrongs, and fundamental questions were left unasked and unanswered.

Conservative Commentator Helen Andrews writing in The American Conservative criticized the process:

The Truth and Reconciliation Commission was a major tactical error on Harper's part. It invited testimony from survivors and then let that testimony stand unquestioned...this resulted in a document that was essentially oral history but which was treated upon publication as an unquestionable record of the facts endorsed by the federal government. Everything about the way the commission gathered its testimony was structured to encourage atrocity tales: witnesses testified in public, with audiences that sometimes booed positive statements; boxes of tissues were placed on seats and attendees told their used tissues would be collected and burned in a "sacred fire"; financial compensation was greater for those who could credibly claim to have suffered abuse, so alleging bad treatment could be the difference between getting $25,000 or $125,000.

== Legacy ==
In August 2018, the Royal Canadian Geographical Society announced the release of the Indigenous Peoples Atlas of Canada, an encyclopedia with content including information about indigenous lands, languages, communities, treaties, and cultures, and topics such as the Canadian Indian residential school system, racism, and cultural appropriation. It was created to address the Calls to Action, among them the development of "culturally appropriate curricula" for Aboriginal Canadian students.

The Nordic countries of Norway, Sweden, and Finland have established truth and reconciliation commissions to address the colonialization of the Saami people which are modelled on the Canadian commission. Norway created its commission in 2018, and Sweden and Finland followed in 2021.

== See also ==
- Canadian genocide of Indigenous peoples
- Residential school denialism
