= Lloyd Snelgrove =

Canadian politician

The Honourable Lloyd Snelgrove ECA

MLA for Vermilion-Lloydminster
- In office 2001–2012
- Preceded by: Steve West
- Succeeded by: Richard Starke

Personal details
- Born: March 27, 1956 (age 70) Vermilion, Alberta
- Party: Independent

Lloyd Snelgrove ECA (born March 27, 1956) is a Canadian politician, who represented the electoral district of Vermilion-Lloydminster in the Legislative Assembly of Alberta. He was a member of the Progressive Conservative Party.

== Political career ==
Snelgrove was elected in the 2001 Alberta general election in the district of Vermilion-Lloydminster as a member of the Progressive Conservative Party of Alberta, and was subsequently re-elected in the 2004 and 2008 elections. Snelgrove briefly served as Minister of Finance under the government of Ed Stelmach. He decided to leave the Progressive Conservative caucus on January 27, 2012 and sit is an Independent after becoming disenchanted with Premier Alison Redford.
