= Niigaan Sinclair =

Anishinaabe academic and writer based in Winnipeg, Manitoba

Niigaanwewidam James Sinclair
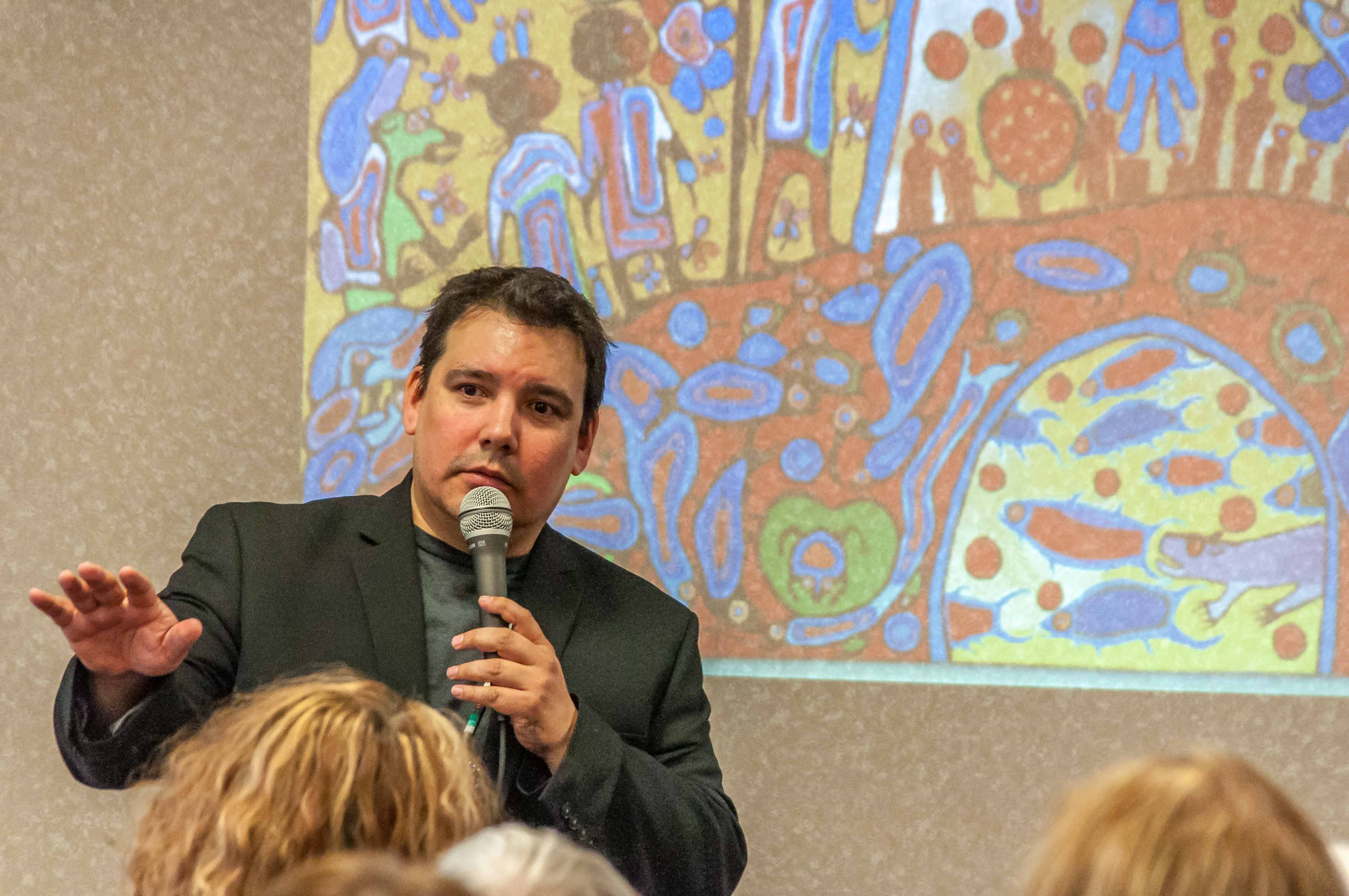
- Education: University of Winnipeg (BEd; BA in political science; BA (Hons) in English); Centre for Indigenous Theatre (performing arts certificate); University of Oklahoma (MA in literary and cultural studies); University of British Columbia (PhD in English)
- Occupations: Writer, editor, professor, journalist, activist
- Parents: Murray Sinclair; Jeanette Warren
- Writing career
- Notable work: Wînipêk: Visions of Canada from an Indigenous Centre
- Notable awards: National Newspaper Award for columns (2018, 2025); Peace Educator of the Year Award (2019); Governor General's Award for English-language non-fiction (2024)

Niigaanwewidam James Sinclair, also referred to as Niigaan James Sinclair or Niigaan Sinclair, is an Anishinaabe writer, editor, professor, and activist based in Winnipeg, Manitoba.

== Early life and education ==
Originally from Selkirk, Manitoba Sinclair is the son of the late and former Canadian Senator Murray Sinclair (1951-2024) and Jeanette Warren.

Sinclair earned three bachelor's degrees from the University of Winnipeg. He began with education and political science in 2000, followed by an honours degree in English in 2004. He also completed a performing arts certificate at Toronto's Centre for Indigenous Theatre in 2001.

He earned a master's degree in literary and cultural studies from the University of Oklahoma in 2006, studying the autobiographical writing of Anishinaabe writer Peter Jones, also known as Kahkewaquonabay. He completed a doctorate in English at the University of British Columbia in 2013, researching Anishinaabe narrative history.

== Career ==
Sinclair is a professor and former Head of the Department of Indigenous Studies at the University of Manitoba where he holds the Faculty of Arts Professorship in Indigenous Knowledge and Aesthetics. He is also a former secondary school teacher who taught at École Kelvin Secondaire High School in Winnipeg, Manitoba.

Sinclair is a co-editor of a special issue of the Canadian Journal of Native Studies and award-winning books such as Manitowapow: Aboriginal Writings from the Land of Water (Highwater Press, 2011) and Centering Anishinaabeg Studies: Understanding the World Through Stories (Michigan State University Press, 2013).

He edited and authored two chapters ("Dancing in a mall" and "the words we have inherited") in Winter We Danced: Voices of the Past, the Future, and the Idle No More Movement (Arbeiter Ring Publishing, 2014) as well as a number of graphic novels.

He is also a journalist for the Winnipeg Free Press and a co-host of the newspaper's podcast called Niigaan and the Lone Ranger. In addition, he is a captain with the Mama Bear Clan patrol in North Point Douglas in Winnipeg's inner city.

He has helped organize Idle No More Winnipeg events and frequently speaks on Indigenous issues on CTV, CBC and APTN. He is a featured commentator on CBC's Power & Politics and APTN National News' Truth and Politics panel.

== Awards and honours ==
=== Journalism awards ===
- 2018: National Newspaper Award for columns in the Winnipeg Free Press.
- 2025: Mary Ann Shadd Cary Award for Columns at the National Newspaper Awards, for his work in the Winnipeg Free Press.

=== Literary awards ===
- 2024: Governor General's Award for English-language non-fiction for Wînipêk: Visions of Canada from an Indigenous Centre.

=== Education awards ===
- 2019: Peace Educator of the Year Award from the Peace and Justice Studies Association.

=== Other recognition ===
- 2022: Named to Maclean's magazine's Power List, sharing the number 30 position with his father, Murray Sinclair.
- 2024: Included in Ace Burpee's list of the 100 most fascinating Manitobans.
- Named one of Canada's 20 most influential people by Monocle magazine.

== Publications ==
- "Dancing in a mall," and "The words we have inherited," In Winter We Danced: Voices of the Past, the Future, and the Idle No More Movement (ARP Books, 2014). ISBN 978-1-894037-51-8
- "Water scroll," In Tales from Moccasin Avenue: An anthology of Native Stories (Totem Poles Books, 2006). ISBN 978-0-9735840-2-8
- "Tending to Ourselves: Hybridity and Native Literary Criticism," In Across Cultures/ Across Boarders: Canadian Aboriginal and Native American Literatures (Broadview Press, 2009). ISBN 978-1-55111-726-3
- "A sovereignty of transmotion: Imagination and the "real" Gerlad Vizenor, and Native literary nationalism," In Stories Through Theories/ Theories Through Stores: North American Indian Writing, Storytelling, and Critique (Michigan State University Press, 2009). ISBN 978-0-87013-841-6
- "Trickster Reflections: Part I," and "Trickster Reflections: Part II," In Troubling Tricksters Revisioning Critical Conversations (Wilfrid Laurier University Press, 2010). ISBN 978-1-55458-205-1, 978-1-282-53439-1, 978-6-61-253439-3, 978-1-55458-290-7

== Graphic novels ==
- Redcoats-ish (Renegade Arts Entertainment, 2014). ISBN 978-0-9921508-6-0, 978-1-988903-36-1
- The Loxleys and Confederation (Renegades Arts Entertainment, 2015). ISBN 978-0-9921508-9-1
- Redcoats-ish 2 (Renegade Arts Entertainment, 2018). ISBN 978-1-988903-36-1

== Editorial contributions ==
- Manitowapow: Aboriginal Writings from the Land of Water (Highwater Press, 2011). ISBN 978-1-55379-307-6
- Centering Anishinaabeg studies: Understanding the world through stories (University of Manitoba Press, 2017). ISBN 978-1-927849-29-3
- Impact: Colonialism in Canada (Manitoba First Nations Education Resource Centre, 2017). ISBN 978-1-927849-29-3
- Indigenous nationhood: Empowering grassroots citizens (Fernwood Publishing, 2015). ISBN 978-1-55266-795-8
