= Vermilion-Lloydminster =

Defunct provincial electoral district in Alberta, Canada

Coordinates: 53.3°N 111.0°W

Alberta electoral district
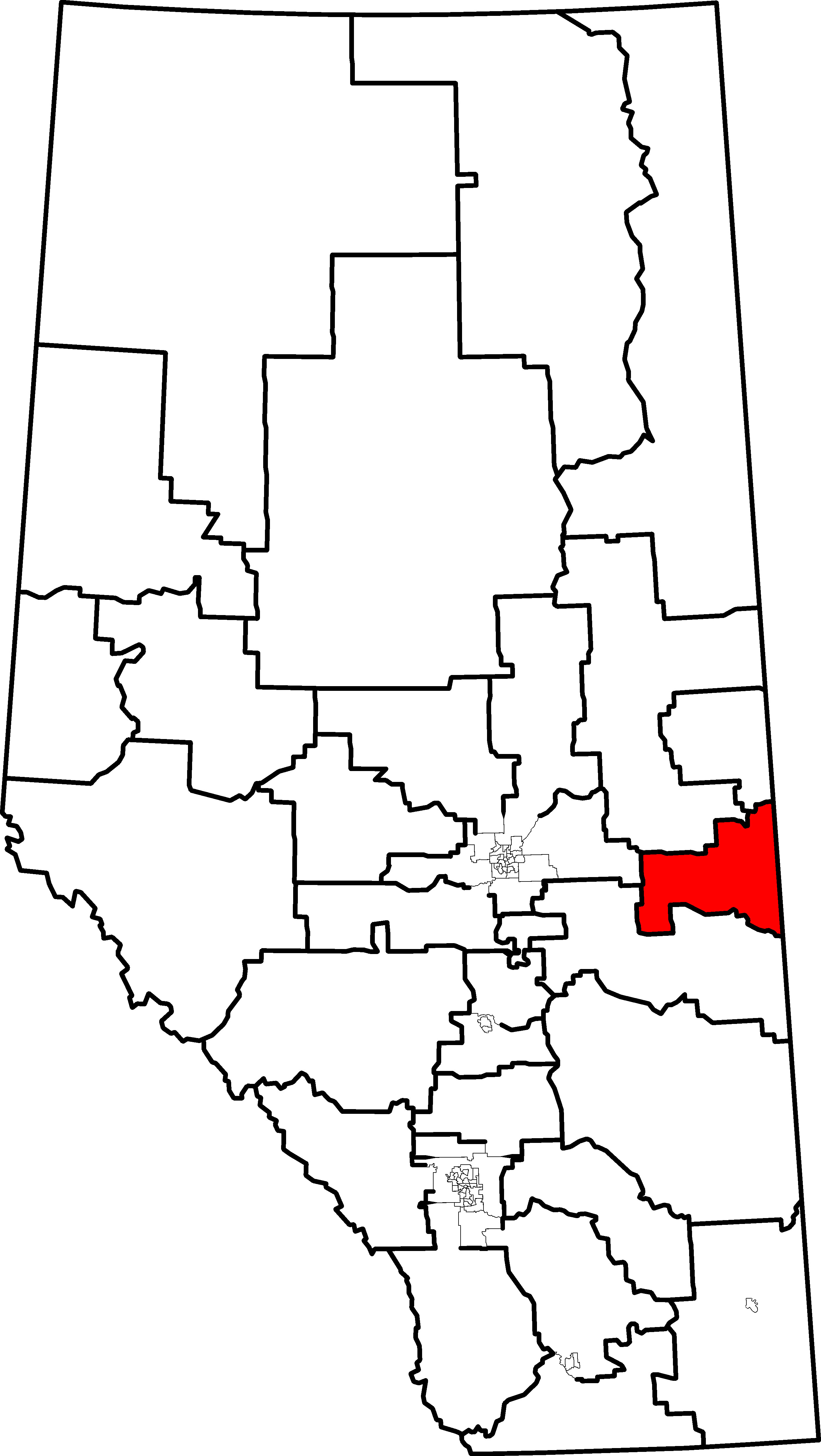
- 2003 boundaries

Defunct provincial electoral district
- Legislature: Legislative Assembly of Alberta
- District created: 1993
- District abolished: 2019
- First contested: 1993
- Last contested: 2015

Vermilion-Lloydminster was a provincial electoral district in Alberta, Canada, mandated to return a single member to the Legislative Assembly of Alberta using first past the post method of voting from 1993 to 2019.

The largest communities in the constituency are the city of Lloydminster, town of Vermilion, and the town Viking.

== History ==
The electoral district was created in the 1993 boundary re-distribution out of the old Lloydminster and Vermilion-Viking districts.

Under the Alberta electoral boundary re-distribution of 2004, the constituency was bounded by the Saskatchewan border to the east, and clockwise from there is bounded by Battle River-Wainwright, Fort Saskatchewan-Vegreville, Lac La Biche-St. Paul, and Bonnyville-Cold Lake. The district remained completely unchanged in the 2010 electoral boundary re-distribution.

The electoral district was abolished in the 2017 electoral boundary re-distribution, and redistributed into Vermilion-Lloydminster-Wainwright and Fort Saskatchewan-Vegreville electoral districts which would take effect for the 2019 Alberta general election.

=== Boundary history ===
80 Vermilion-Lloydminster 2003 boundaries
Bordering districts
North	East	West	South
Bonnyville-Cold Lake and Lac La Biche-St. Paul	Saskatchewan boundary	Fort Saskatchewan-Vegreville	Battle River-Wainwright
riding map goes here			
Legal description from the Statutes of Alberta 2003, Electoral Divisions Act.
Starting at the intersection of Highway 36 with the north boundary of Sec. 6 in Twp. 53, Rge. 12 W4; then 1. east along the north boundary of Secs. 6, 5, 4, 3, 2 and 1 in Twp. 53, Rges. 12 and 11 W4 to the east boundary of Rge. 11 W4; 2. south along the east boundary of Rge. 11 W4 to the north boundary of Twp. 52; 3. east along the north boundary of Twp. 52 to the east boundary of the west half of Sec. 34 in Twp. 52, Rge. 8 W4; 4. south along the east boundary of the west half of Sec. 34 to the north boundary of the south half of Sec. 34; 5. east along the north boundary of the south half of Secs. 34 and 35 to the east boundary of the west half of Sec. 35; 6. south along the east boundary of the west half of Sec. 35 to the north boundary of Sec. 26; 7. east along the north boundary of Secs. 26 and 25 in the Twp. and the north boundary of Secs. 30, 29, 28 and 27 in Twp. 52, Rge. 7 W4 to the east boundary of Sec. 34; 8. north along the east boundary of Sec. 34 in the Twp. and the east boundary of Secs. 3, 10 and 15 in Twp. 53, Rge. 7 W4 to the north boundary of Sec. 14; 9. east along the north boundary of Secs. 14 and 13 in Twp. 53, Rge. 7 W4 and the north boundary of Secs. 18, 17, 16 and 15 in Rge. 6 to the east boundary of Sec. 22; 10. north along the east boundary of Secs. 22, 27 and 34 in the Twp. and the east boundary of Secs. 3, 10, 15, 22, 27 and 34 in Twp. 54 and the east boundary of Secs. 3, 10, 15 and 22 in Twp. 55 to the north boundary of Sec. 23 in Twp. 55, Rge. 6 W4; 11. east along the north boundary of Secs. 23 and 24 in the Twp. and the north boundary of Secs. 19, 20, 21, 22, 23 and 24 in Twp. 55, Rge. 5 W4 and the north boundary of Secs. 19, 20 and 21 in Twp. 55, Rge. 4 W4 to the right bank of the North Saskatchewan River; 12. downstream along the right bank to the north boundary of Twp. 54, Rge. 3 W4; 13. east along the north boundary of Twp. 54 to the east boundary of Sec. 4 in Twp. 55, Rge. 3 W4; 14. north along the east boundary of Secs. 4, 9, 16, 21, 28 and 33 to the north boundary of Twp. 55, Rge. 3 W4; 15. east along the north boundary of Twp. 55 to the east boundary of the west half of Sec. 3, Twp. 56, Rge. 3 W4; 16. north along the east boundary of the west half of Secs. 3 and 10 to the north boundary of the south half of Sec. 10 in the Twp.; 17. east along the north boundary of the south half of Sec. 10 to the south boundary of Unipouheous Indian Reserve No. 121; 18. east and north along the Indian Reserve to the south boundary of the Fishing Lake Métis Settlement; 19. east, north and east along the Métis Settlement to the east boundary of the Province; 20. south along the east boundary of the Province to the right bank of the Battle River; 21. upstream along the right bank to the north boundary of Sec. 17 in Twp. 47, Rge. 5 W4; 22. west along the north boundary of Secs. 17 and 18 in the Twp. and the north boundary of Secs. 13, 14, 15, 16, 17 and 18 in Twp. 47, Rges. 6 and 7 W4 to the east boundary of Rge. 8 W4; 23. north along the east boundary to the north boundary of Sec. 24 in Twp. 47, Rge. 8 W4; 24. west along the north boundary to the east boundary of the west half of Sec. 25 in the Twp.; 25. north along the east boundary of the west half of Sec. 25 to the north boundary of Sec. 25; 26. west along the north boundary of Secs. 25 and 26 in the Twp. to the east boundary of Sec. 34 in the Twp.; 27. north along the east boundary of Sec. 34 to the north boundary of the south half of Sec. 34; 28. west along the north boundary of the south half of Sec. 34 to the east boundary of Sec. 33 in the Twp.; 29. north along the east boundary of Sec. 33 to the north boundary of Twp. 47; 30. west along the north boundary of Twp. 47 to the east boundary of Sec. 6 in Twp. 48, Rge. 8 W4; 31. north along the east boundary of Sec. 6 to the north boundary of the south half of Sec. 6; 32. west along the north boundary of the south half of Sec. 6 to the east boundary of the west half of Sec. 6; 33. north along the east boundary of the west half of Sec. 6 to the north boundary of Sec. 6; 34. west along the north boundary of Sec. 6 to the east boundary of Rge. 9 W4; 35. north along the east boundary of Rge. 9 W4 to the north boundary of Sec. 12 in Twp. 48, Rge. 9 W4; 36. west along the north boundary of Sec. 12 to the east boundary of the west half of Sec. 13 in the Twp.; 37. north along the east boundary of the west half of Sec. 13 to the north boundary of the south half of Sec. 13; 38. west along the north boundary of the south half of Secs. 13 and 14 in the Twp. to the east boundary of the west half of Sec. 14; 39. north along the east boundary of the west half of Sec. 14 to the north boundary of Sec. 14; 40. west along the north boundary of Secs. 14, 15, 16 and 17 in the Twp. to the east boundary of Sec. 18 in the Twp.; 41. south along the east boundary to the north boundary of the south half of Sec. 18; 42. west along the north boundary to the east boundary of Rge. 10 W4; 43. north along the east boundary to the north boundary of Sec. 13 in Twp. 48, Rge. 10 W4; 44. west along the north boundary of Secs. 13, 14, 15, 16 and 17 in the Twp. to the east boundary of the west half of Sec. 17 in the Twp.; 45. south along the east boundary of the west half of Secs. 17, 8 and 5 in the Twp. and the east boundary of the west half of Secs. 32, 29, 20, 17, 8 and 5 in Twp. 47, Rge. 10 W4 to the north boundary of Twp. 46; 46. east along the north boundary to the east boundary of Sec. 32 in Twp. 46, Rge. 10 W4; 47. south along the east boundary of Secs. 32, 29, 20, 17, 8 and 5 in Twp. 46, Rge. 10 W4 to the north boundary of Twp. 45; 48. west along the north boundary to the east boundary of Sec. 3 in Twp. 46, Rge. 13 W4; 49. north along the east boundary to the north boundary of Sec. 3; 50. west along the north boundary of Secs. 3 and 4 to the intersection with Highway 36; 51. north along Highway 36 to the north boundary of Twp. 46 52. west along the north boundary of Twp. 46 to the east boundary of Sec. 5 in Twp. 47, Rge. 13 W4; 53. north along the east boundary of Secs. 5, 8, 17, 20, 29 and 32 in the Twp. and the east boundary of Secs. 5, 8, 17 and 20 in Twp. 48 to the north boundary of Sec. 21; 54. east along the north boundary of Secs. 21, 22 and 23 to Highway 36 in Twp. 48, Rge. 13 W4; 55. north along Highway 36 to the starting point.
Note:

84 Vermilion-Lloydminster 2010 boundaries
Bordering districts
North	East	West	South
Bonnyville-Cold Lake and Lac La Biche-St. Paul-Two Hills	Saskatchewan boundary	Fort Saskatchewan-Vegreville	Battle River-Wainwright
Legal description from the Statutes of Alberta 2010, Electoral Divisions Act.
Legal description from the Statutes of Alberta 2003, Electoral Divisions Act.
Note: The district remained unchanged in 2010.

=== Electoral history ===
Members of the Legislative Assembly for Vermilion-Lloydminster
Assembly	Years	Member	Party
See Lloydminster and Vermilion-Viking 1971–1993
23rd	1993–1997	Steve West	Progressive; Conservative
24th	1997–2001	Steve West	Progressive; Conservative
25th	2001–2004	Lloyd Snelgrove	Progressive; Conservative
26th	2004–2008	Lloyd Snelgrove	Progressive; Conservative
27th	2008–2012	Lloyd Snelgrove	Progressive; Conservative
27th	2012	Lloyd Snelgrove	Independent
28th	2012–2015	Richard Starke	Progressive; Conservative
29th	2015–2019	Richard Starke	Progressive; Conservative
See Vermilion-Lloydminster-Wainwright and Fort Saskatchewan-Vegreville 2019–

The riding was created in 1993 and has been returning Progressive Conservative MLA's with large majorities since it was created. The first member was Steve West who had previously served as MLA for Vermilion-Viking for two terms beginning in 1986. While representing this riding he served a number of cabinet portfolios in the government of Ralph Klein. West retired from office in 2001.

The second representative of the riding is Lloyd Snelgrove who was first elected in 2001 and has since served three terms in office. Snelgrove briefly served as Minister of Finance under the government of Ed Stelmach. He decided to leave the Progressive Conservative caucus on January 27, 2012, and sit as an independent after becoming disenchanted with Premier Alison Redford.

Dr. Richard Starke won the riding for the Progressive Conservatives in the 2012 election, and was one of only two PC MLAs to win re-election outside of Calgary in the 2015 election. He placed second in the PC leadership election of 2017 on a campaign of remaining an independent party from Wildrose. When the PCs subsequently voted to join the Wildrose and form the United Conservative Party, he announced he would continue to sit as a PC rather than join the new party.

Starke retired at the end of the 29th Legislature. The district was abolished at the same time, and replaced with Vermilion-Lloydminster-Wainwright.

== Legislative election results ==
=== 1993 ===
1993 Alberta general election
Party	Candidate	Votes	%	±%
Progressive Conservative	Steve West	5,524	52.30%	–
Liberal	Greg Michaud	4,295	40.66%	–
New Democratic	Grant Bergman	744	7.04%	–
Total		10,563	–	–
Rejected, spoiled and declined		33	–	–
Eligible electors / turnout		17,872	59.29%	–
Progressive Conservative pickup new district.				
Source(s) Source: "Vermilion-Lloydminster Official Results 1993 Alberta general election". Alberta Heritage Community Foundation.

=== 1997 ===
1997 Alberta general election
Party	Candidate	Votes	%	±%
Progressive Conservative	Steve West	5,616	55.44%	3.14%
Liberal	Pat Gulak	2,787	27.51%	-13.15%
Social Credit	Jeff Newland	1,125	11.11%	–
New Democratic	Wes Neumeier	602	5.94%	-1.10%
Total		10,130	–	–
Rejected, spoiled and declined		20	–	–
Eligible electors / turnout		19,002	53.42%	-5.87%
Progressive Conservative hold		Swing		8.15%
Source(s) Source: "Vermilion-Lloydminster Official Results 1997 Alberta general election". Alberta Heritage Community Foundation.

=== 2001 ===
2001 Alberta general election
Party	Candidate	Votes	%	±%
Progressive Conservative	Lloyd Snelgrove	6,978	73.28%	17.84%
Liberal	David Tschorn	980	10.29%	-17.22%
New Democratic	Raymond Stone	976	10.25%	4.31%
Alberta First	Grant West	589	6.19%	–
Total		9,523	–	–
Rejected, spoiled and declined		34	–	–
Eligible electors / turnout		19,847	48.15%	-5.26%
Progressive Conservative hold		Swing		17.53%
Source(s) Source: "Vermilion-Lloydminster Official Results 2001 Alberta general election". Alberta Heritage Community Foundation.

=== 2004 ===
2004 Alberta general election
Party	Candidate	Votes	%	±%
Progressive Conservative	Lloyd Snelgrove	5,466	59.66%	-13.62%
Alberta Alliance	David Benoit	2,437	26.60%	–
Liberal	Patricia Thomas	706	7.71%	-2.59%
New Democratic	Ray Stone	553	6.04%	-4.21%
Total		9,162	–	–
Rejected, spoiled and declined		25	–	–
Eligible electors / turnout		21,796	42.15%	-6.00%
Progressive Conservative hold		Swing		-14.96%
Source(s) Source: "Vermilion-Lloydminster Official Results 2004 Alberta general election". Alberta Heritage Community Foundation.

=== 2008 ===
2008 Alberta general election
Party	Candidate	Votes	%	±%
Progressive Conservative	Lloyd Snelgrove	7,013	80.75%	21.09%
Liberal	Robert Sawatzky	826	9.51%	1.80%
New Democratic	Wendy Myshak	482	5.55%	-0.49%
Green	Ngaio Hotte	364	4.19%	–
Total		8,685	–	–
Rejected, spoiled and declined		14	–	–
Eligible electors / turnout		23,399	37.18%	-4.97%
Progressive Conservative hold		Swing		19.09%
Source(s) Source: "Elections Alberta 2008 General Election". Elections Alberta.

=== 2012 ===
2012 Alberta general election
Party	Candidate	Votes	%	±%
Progressive Conservative	Richard Starke	6,255	51.95%	-28.80%
Wildrose	Danny Hozack	4,509	37.45%	–
Liberal	Corina Ganton	463	3.85%	-5.67%
New Democratic	Ray Stone	415	3.45%	-2.10%
Independent	Richard Yaceyko	399	3.31%	–
Total		12,041	–	–
Rejected, spoiled and declined		52	–	–
Eligible electors / turnout		23,340	51.81%	14.64%
Progressive Conservative hold		Swing		-28.37%
Source(s) Source: "Elections Alberta 2012 General Election". Elections Alberta.

=== 2015 ===
2015 Alberta general election
Party	Candidate	Votes	%	±%
Progressive Conservative	Richard Starke	5,935	47.35%	-4.60%
Wildrose	Danny Hozack	4,171	33.28%	-4.17%
New Democratic	Saba Mossagizi	2,428	19.37%	15.92%
Total		12,534	–	–
Rejected, spoiled and declined		55	–	–
Eligible electors / turnout		26,918	46.77%	-5.04%
Progressive Conservative hold		Swing		-0.21%
Source(s) Source: "Elections Alberta 2015 General Election". Elections Alberta.

== Senate nominee election results ==
=== 2004 ===
2004 Senate nominee election results: Vermilion-Lloydminster				Turnout 41.97%	
Affiliation	Candidate	Votes	% votes	% ballots	Rank
Progressive Conservative	Bert Brown	3,565	15.20%	47.97%	1
Progressive Conservative	Betty Unger	3,469	14.79%	46.68%	2
Progressive Conservative	Cliff Breitkreuz	2,702	11.52%	36.36%	3
Independent	Link Byfield	2,296	9.79%	30.89%	4
Progressive Conservative	David Usherwood	2,202	9.39%	29.63%	6
Alberta Alliance	Michael Roth	2,183	9.31%	29.37%	7
Progressive Conservative	Jim Silye	2,181	9.30%	29.35%	5
Alberta Alliance	Gary Horan	1,890	8.06%	25.43%	10
Alberta Alliance	Vance Gough	1,878	8.01%	25.27%	8
Independent	Tom Sindlinger	1,090	4.64%	14.67%	9
Total votes		23,456	100%		
Total ballots		7,432	3.16 votes per ballot		
Rejected, spoiled and declined		1,716			

Voters had the option of selecting four candidates on the ballot

== Student vote results ==
=== 2004 ===
Participating schools
Holy Rosary High School
J.R. Robson School
South Ferriby School
Tulliby Lake School
Vermilion Elementary School
Viking School

On November 19, 2004, a student vote was conducted at participating Alberta schools to parallel the 2004 Alberta general election results. The vote was designed to educate students and simulate the electoral process for persons who have not yet reached the legal majority. The vote was conducted in 80 of the 83 provincial electoral districts with students voting for actual election candidates. Schools with a large student body that reside in another electoral district had the option to vote for candidates outside of the electoral district then where they were physically located.

2004 Alberta student vote results
Affiliation	Candidate	Votes	%
Progressive Conservative	Lloyd Snelgrove	546	58.15%
Alberta Alliance	David Benoit	188	20.02%
Liberal	Patricia Thomas	128	13.63%
NDP	Ray Stone	77	8.20%
Total		939	100%
Rejected, spoiled and declined		37	

=== 2012 ===
2012 Alberta student vote results
Affiliation	Candidate	Votes	%
Progressive Conservative	Dr. Richard Starke		%
Wildrose	Danny Hozack		
Liberal	Corina Ganton		%
NDP	Raymond Stone		%
Total			100%

== See also ==
- List of Alberta provincial electoral districts
- Canadian provincial electoral districts
