= Jim Leech =

Canadian business executive

Jim Leech CM CD OOnt

14th Chancellor of Queen's University
- In office July 1, 2014 – 30 June 2021
- Preceded by: David A. Dodge
- Succeeded by: Murray Sinclair

President and chief executive officer of the Ontario Teachers’ Pension Plan
- In office 1 December 2007 – December 31, 2013
- Preceded by: Claude Lamoureux
- Succeeded by: Ron Mock

Personal details
- Born: James William Leech; June 12, 1947 (age 79) Saint Boniface, Manitoba
- Spouse: Deborah Barrett
- Children: Jennifer, Joanna and Andrew
- Education: Queen's University; Royal Military College of Canada

James William (Jim) Leech CM CD OOnt (born June 12, 1947) is a Canadian business executive. Since 2021, he has been chancellor-emeritus of Queen's University in Kingston, Ontario, Canada. From 2014 to 2021, he was the 14th Chancellor of Queen's University. Prior to that, he spent 12 years at the Ontario Teachers’ Pension Plan (OTPP), first for 6 years as a senior vice-president of OTPP head of Teachers' Private Capital, OTPP's private investment arm, and then as president and chief executive officer of the pension plan until his retirement in 2013.

== Early life, education and military service ==
He was born in Saint Boniface, Winnipeg into a military family, where his father, George Leech, and uncle, Don Laubman, were senior regular force career officers in the Canadian Armed Forces. During his elementary and secondary school years, Leech moved around Canada living in Ottawa, Kingston as well as Canadian army bases, including CFB Kingston and Camp Petawawa, both in Ontario, and CFB Edmonton, Alberta. He graduated from Queen Elizabeth High School (Edmonton) in 1964.

Leech attended Royal Roads Military College, whose 2-year program bridged with a 4-year degree at Royal Military College of Canada, where he majored in mathematics and physics and obtained his Bachelor of Science in 1968. He joined the Royal Canadian Corps of Signals after graduation and was posted first at the 1^{er} Batailion Royal 22^{e} Régiment (1R22^{e}R), and then at the 4 Canadian Mechanized Brigade Group Headquarters and Signal Squadron for the North Atlantic Treaty Organization forces in Werl and Soest, respectively, in then-West Germany. He was promoted to captain at the age of 22 and returned to the 1R22^{e}R Regiment in Lahr, West Germany as Signals Officer. He resigned from military service in 1971, and enrolled in Master of Business Administration program at Queen's University, where his father was working as a registrar after his retirement from the military. Leech earned his MBA two years later.

Leech is a graduate of the Institute of Corporate Directors (ICD) in 2004.

== Early career ==
After graduating from MBA, Leech joined the Montreal-based financial and real estate firm Commerce Capital Corporation and held senior executive positions in Montreal, Calgary and Toronto until the company's sale to Eaton/Bay Financial Services. In 1979, through founder George Mann, Leech joined Unicorp Canada Corporation, one of the first public merchant banks in the country, becoming its president in 1983 by which time Unicorp had built a large US commercial real estate portfolio through the acquisition of US Real Estate Investment Trusts. He led the first major hostile takeover in Canada in 1985, gaining control of Union Enterprises Ltd., the parent company of Union Gas, a Southern Ontario natural gas utility company. He became the president and CEO of Union Energy after the acquisition which became one of the largest integrated energy companies in North America. Subsequently, Unicorp acquired Lincoln Savings Bank, a savings bank in New York, but the deal resulted in Unicorp's US subsidiary losing almost USD$100 million. In 1992, Vancouver-based Westcoast Energy Inc. (now Westcoast Transmission Co.) purchased Union Energy and Leech ended his relationship with the company. Unicorp subsequently changed its name to Wilmington Capital Management Inc.

Leech next joined Disys Ltd. in 1993 as president and CEO., beginning his career into the technology sector. The main business of Disys was manufacturing smoke alarms, but it also had research in Radio Frequency Identification (RFID) technology, which Leech thought would be funded by the mature smoke-alarm business. To effect this plan, he sold the smoke alarm business and merged Disys and the RFID into Kasten Chase Applied Research Ltd, which Leech moved to as vice-chairman in 1996.

In 1999, Leech joined Infocast Corp., an application service provider start-up based in Toronto. He left in 2001.

== Career at Ontario Teachers’ Pension Plan ==
Initially planning to retire, Leech accepted an offer in 2001 from Claude Lamoureux, then-president and CEO of the Ontario Teachers' Pension Plan (OTPP), to become the senior vice-president of OTPP and lead the Teachers' Private Capital (TPC) (then named Teachers' Merchant Bank), OTPP's private investment arm. At that time, OTPP was about to change its way of investing, from holding only minority investment positions in publicly-listed companies and bonds to also buying control of private companies.

Under Leech's leadership, Teachers' Private Capital and OTPP completed numerous large and high-profile transactions:

- In 2002, TPC teamed up with the private equity firm KKR and acquired Yellow Pages Group from BCE for $3 billion in 2002. Yellow Pages was converted into an income trust and listed on the Toronto Stock Exchange one year later.
- In 2003, a restructuring of the Maple Leaf Sports & Entertainment (MLSE), which owns Toronto Maple Leafs of the National Hockey League, Toronto Raptors of the National Basketball Association and Scotiabank Arena (then named Air Canada Centre) saw OTPP became the owner of the company, increasing its stake from 49% to 58.4%. Leech oversaw this transition from longtime owner Steve Stavro. In 2005, MLSE paid USD$10 million for a new team in the Major League Soccer, later named Toronto FC. OTPP sold MLSE to BCE Inc. and Rogers Communications in 2012 for CAD$1.32 billion.
- In 2006, TPC purchased of GCT Global Container Terminals Inc. from Orient Overseas (International) Limited for US$2.4 billion in 2006. GCT operates four North American container ports, two in the Port of New York and New Jersey area and two in Port Metro Vancouver. OTPP sold most of its stake in GCT in 2018, forming a management partnership with the Australian-based IFM Investors and British Columbia Investment Management Corporation, a Crown corporation in Canada.
- In 2007, under Leech's leadership, Teachers' Private Capital, together with Providence Equity Partners and Madison Dearborn, started a bidding war for BCE Inc., fighting against Canada Pension Plan Investment Board, which teamed up with KKR. Owning 5.3% of shares, OTPP was the largest shareholder of BCE at the time. The final bid totalled CAD$51.7 billion, which included CAD$34 billion in debt and split into CAD$34.8 billion for stock and CAD$16.9 billion for liabilities, making it the largest leveraged buyout in history. As the 2008 financial crisis unfolded, uncertainty regarding the debt financing grew. The deal also faced legal challenges from BCE bondholders which were eventually dismissed. The buyout eventually collapsed a year later, as KPMG, concluded that debt load would make the company resulting from the transaction insolvent, which had been a condition of the transaction.

In September 2007, OTPP announced the appointment of Leech as its new president and CEO, succeeding Claude Lamoureux, who was retiring and has been leading OTPP since 1990. He started his new role on December 1, 2007.

As CEO, Leech also oversaw a number of major deals, including four in 2010 (acquisition of Camelot Group, which operates the UK National Lottery and of High Speed 1, then and still the only high-speed railway in the UK, as well as sale of OTPP's stakes in Bell Media Inc. (then named CTVglobemedia Inc.) back to BCE Inc. and of its stakes in Maple Leaf Foods, first to West Face Capital and then to BMO Capital Markets and TD Securities. OTPP also sold MLSE to BCE Inc. and Rogers Communications in 2012, and opened an office in Hong Kong in 2013, the second major regional office after its London office opened in 2007.

Leech has expressed intention to retire at the end of 2013. He retired from OTPP on December 31, 2013. During his tenure, OTPP ranked number one amongst peer plans in the world in Five Year Investment Performance and Service to Members as measured by CEM Benchmarking Inc and reported a funding surplus.

== Career after OTPP ==
Following his business career, Leech has focused on philanthropic leadership and non-partisan public service.

Leech assumed the role of the 14th Chancellor of Queen's University on July 1, 2014., furthering his involvement with his alma mater, which started with his election to the University Council and the board of trustees in the 1980s, and subsequent chairing the advisory board of Smith School of Business (formerly the Queen's School of Business) on three separate occasions. His term ended in June 2021 and became chancellor-emeritus; he was succeeded by Murray Sinclair.

In the same year, he also became Special Advisor to the Ontario Minister of Finance, a senior advisor at the consulting firm McKinsey & Company in 2014, the chair of the Board of Directors of the MasterCard Foundation, and also Toronto General and Western Hospital Foundation. which is now part of the UHN Foundation. His term at these two foundations ended in 2018 and 2020 respectively, although he continued as a board member at both foundations.

In 2014, Leech participated in a 53-person expedition to ski Canada's North Magnetic Pole, sponsored by True Patriot Love Foundation to raise funds and awareness to support Canadian veterans suffering from Post Traumatic Stress Disorder.

In 2017, Prime Minister of Canada Justin Trudeau appointed Leech Special Advisor on the Canada Infrastructure Bank. He is also chairing the advisory board of Peloton Capital Management since its founding in 2018, and of the Institute for Sustainable Finance at the Smith School of Business since its launch in 2019, and sits on Board of Directors of Historica Canada.

From 2014 to 2021, Leech was Honorary Colonel of 32 Signal Regiment, Canadian Army in Toronto and was given the Canadian Forces' Decoration for his time in that honorary role.

In 2013, Leech co-wrote, with journalist Jacquie McNish, The third rail: confronting our pension failures, which discusses the crises facing the Canadian pension system. It won the 2014 National Business Book Award and was a runner-up of the 2013 Donner Prize.

Since late 2025, Leech has been a volunteer Presiding Officer at Canadian Citizenship Ceremonies Oath of Citizenship (Canada) in the Greater Toronto Area.

Mr Leech is known to be a Proud Ally of the LGBTQ2S+ community.

== Honours and awards ==
- Canadian Army Award; HE Sellers Award (outstanding Royal Roads Graduate) (1964)
- Department of National Defense Award of Merit; RMC Club Toronto Branch Award; Commandant's Cup; and RC Sigs Subaltern's Course (Best Student) (1968)
- Special Service Medal (Canada) NATO-OTAN - Canadian Armed Forces (1971)
- DI McLeod Scholarship/Research Fellowship; Transportation Development Agency Fellowship; and Samuel Bronfman Foundation Scholarship (1971)
- Canadian Securities Course, Gold Medal (1974)
- Queen's Toronto Branch Alumni Award for Community Service (1992)
- CEO Award of Excellence in Communications - Canadian Public Relations Society, Toronto Chapter (2010)
- Founding Director, Right to Play International (2010)
- Corporate Social Responsibility Award - US/Canadian Foreign Policy Association (2012)
- Champion of Public Education, The Learning Partnership (2009)
- Queen Elizabeth II Diamond Jubilee Medal (2012)
- Member of the Order of Canada (2014)
- Lifetime Achievement Award - Niagara Institute Dialogue (2014)
- Honorary Colonel, 32 Signal Regiment, Canadian Army (2014)
- Wall of Honour, Royal Military College of Canada (2017)
- Honorary Doctor of Law - Royal Military College of Canada (2019)
- Outstanding Volunteer - Association of Fundraising Professionals, Greater Toronto Chapter (2018)
- Canadian Forces' Decoration (2019)
- Order of Ontario (2019)
- Elected a Fellow of the Royal Canadian Geographical Society (2021)
- Alumni Achievement Award - Queen's University (2022)
- Distinguished Service Award - Queen's University (2022)
- Friend of Education Award - Canadian Council for Advancement of Education (2023)
- Honorary Doctor of Law - Queen’s University (2024)
- Lifetime Achievement Award, Ontario Business Achievement Awards - Ontario Chamber of Commerce (2024)
- King Charles III Coronation Medal (2025)

The Jim Leech Mastercard Foundation Fellowship in Entrepreneurship, the Jim Leech MBA Scholarship, the Leech classroom, the Chancellor Jim Leech Bursary for Indigenous Students, Jim Leech- CFPDP Bursary and the Jim Leech Ceilidh Centre at Queen's University are named after Leech.
