= Steve West (Canadian politician) =

Canadian politician

The Honourable Steve West ECA

Member of the Legislative Assembly of Alberta for Vermilion-Lloydminster Vermilion-Viking (1986–1993)
- In office May 8, 1986 – March 12, 2001
- Preceded by: Tom Lysons
- Succeeded by: Lloyd Snelgrove

Personal details
- Born: May 21, 1943 (age 83) London, Ontario, Canada
- Party: Progressive Conservative Association of Alberta
- Occupation: businessman, doctor, farmer, teacher

Stephen Carlyle "Steve" West (born May 21, 1943) is a Canadian businessman, and a former veterinary doctor, teacher, farmer and former provincial level politician. He served as a member of the Legislative Assembly of Alberta from 1986 to 2001. He served numerous portfolios in the cabinet for the Alberta government during his political career.

== Early life ==
Stephen C. West was born in London, Ontario, on May 21, 1943.

He went to post secondary school at the Kitchener-Waterloo Collegiate Institute, and earned his doctorate of Veterinary Medicine at the Ontario Veterinary College. After college West moved to Vermilion and founded the West Veterinary Clinic. He operated his clinic for fifteen years and became a farmer in the area. In addition to his practice he also taught Animal Science Technology at Lakeland College.

== Political career ==
West was first elected to the Alberta Legislature in the 1986 Alberta general election. He easily won a two race over New Democrat candidate Mervin Stephenson in the electoral district of Vermilion-Viking. He was re-elected to his second term in the 1989 Alberta general election winning a three-way race with a slightly reduced plurality over the last election.

West was appointed to his first cabinet portfolio under the government of Don Getty. He served as Minister of Recreation and Parks from April 1989 to February 1992. He became Solicitor General in a cabinet shuffle and held that post until Ralph Klein became Premier in December 1992. Under the Ralph Klein government, West was appointed as Minister of Municipal Affairs. He held that post until December 1994.

Vermilion-Viking was abolished due to redistribution in 1993, West ran for his third term in the new electoral district of Vermilion-Lloydminster. The race was a rerun of the 1989 Vermilion-Viking election as both the challenging candidates for the New Democrats and Liberals faced West for the second time. The race was hotly contested as Liberal candidate Greg Michaud quadrupled his popular vote. Despite the strong showing by the Liberal candidate West won the new district by increasing his popular vote.

West was moved to the Transportation and Utilities portfolio in December 1994, he served that post until May 1996, when he was appointed Minister of Economics Development and Tourism. West was re-elected to his fourth and final term as MLA in the 1997 Alberta general election. He won the electoral district in a landslide with his largest percentage and plurality of his political career. After the election he was appointed Minister of Energy on March 26, 1997. The last post he served in cabinet was as Minister of Finance.

West who served in numerous Cabinet positions through his career as a MLA was known for his efforts to privatize a number of government areas including liquor stores and vehicle registries. During this time West would earn the nickname "Dr. No" for his role in reducing government expenditures and payroll.

In 2004 West would be hired as Premier Ralph Klein's Chief of Staff and abruptly let go seven months later following the 2004 Alberta general election. West's dismissal less than a year into his three-year contract and $180,000 severance package would become a controversy in the Alberta legislature later that year.
