= Queen Elizabeth High School (Edmonton) =

10–12 school in Edmonton, Alberta (est. 1958)

Coordinates: 53°35′28″N 113°29′15″W

Location
- 9425 132 Ave; Edmonton, Alberta, T5E 0Y4; Canada

Information
- School type: Public secondary school
- Motto: Virili Parte (To the Utmost of Our Ability)
- Founded: 1958
- School board: Edmonton Public Schools
- Area trustee: Sherri O'keefe
- Principal: Scott Horton
- Key people: Darrell Kushniruk (resource officer)
- Grades: 10–12
- Enrollment: 1,170 (2014)
- Colours: Purple and gold
- Mascot: The Knight
- Team name: Knights
- Website: queene.epsb.ca

Queen Elizabeth High School, located in north Edmonton, Alberta, Canada, is a senior high school in the Edmonton Public Schools system.

== History ==
Queen Elizabeth High School opened in the year 1958 and is named after Queen Elizabeth II.

Queen Elizabeth High School is also one of only two schools in Alberta to be designated as a UNESCO School.

== Academic programs ==
The school has advanced placement classes. By participating in an AP course, the student is able to enter a world of intense discussion and thought. AP courses give the students intellectual responsibility to think for themselves and to learn to reason, analyze, and understand. AP allows students to undertake college level academic learning and advance into second year college or university courses which traditionally have a much smaller enrollment. Upon successful completion of an AP course, students are eligible to receive university credit and/or advanced placement at over 4000 colleges and universities worldwide. Research shows that AP students are more likely to graduate from university with a double major and are twice as likely to pursue a Ph.D., or studies in medicine or law.

The school has an aviation program instructing students interested in getting a private pilot license, taught by teacher/flight instructor Alan Newsome. The program covers a curriculum provided by Transport Canada.

== Athletics ==
The school athletic teams are called the 'Queen Elizabeth Knights', and the school colours are purple and gold. Athletic programs at the school include: Badminton, Ball Hockey, Basketball, Cross-Country, Football, Rugby, Soccer, Swimming, Team Handball, Volleyball, Weight Training, Wrestling, and curling.

A student led media group known as the "Knights Watch" broadcast several of the Athletics teams games on the school's YouTube channel.

== Individual Support Program ==
The Individual Support Program, for students with severe to profound developmental delays, occupies a classroom and a small, enclosed courtyard which features a rock waterfall, wooden bridge, limestone pathway, and shrubbery, along with a pagoda with spruce log seats and teaching stone. The courtyard, created in 2005, is used as a "Living Classroom" as well as for high school activities and community events. About 20 students are in the program, ranging in age from 14 to 20.

Judges for the 2006/07 School–Community Public Relations Awards selected "The Living Classroom," for the School Award of Excellence.

== English as Second Language ==
English as Second Language (known as ESL) is program for newcomers from many different countries to learn English. Many students who successfully finished ESL courses will enroll to regular dash two classes. If you are interested in different languages you may take Spanish, Punjabi, French and Arabic

== Notable alumni ==
- Daniela Andrade, musician
- Bill Bonko, politician
- Jim Leech, former President & CEO, Ontario Teachers’ Pension Plan; Chancellor Emeritus Queen's University
- Keith Brown, former NHL player (Chicago Blackhawks, Florida Panthers)
- Randy Bucyk, former NHL player (Montreal Canadiens, Calgary Flames, 1986 Stanley Cup champion)
- Tim Tookey, former NHL player (Capitals, Nordiques, Penguins, Flyers, Kings)

== See also ==
- Royal eponyms in Canada
