= Harry LaForme =

Canadian judge (born 1946)

Harry Smith LaForme OC

Mississauga leader

Personal details
- Born: October 31, 1946 (age 80) Mississaugas of the New Credit First Nation
- Education: Osgoode Hall Law School, 1977
- Known for: Former head of the Indian Residential Schools Truth and Reconciliation Commission; first appellate court judge in Canadian history with a First Nations background.
- Awards: 1997 National Aboriginal Achievement Award in Law & Justice

Harry Smith LaForme OC (born October 31, 1946) is a Canadian judge.

A member of the Mississaugas people, LaForme is the first appellate court judge in Canadian history with a First Nations background. He has served as the Commissioner of the Indian Commission of Ontario; as the Chair of the Royal Commission on Aboriginal Land Claims; and – until his resignation in October 2008 – as head of the Indian Residential Schools Truth and Reconciliation Commission.

LaForme graduated from Osgoode Hall Law School in 1977 and was called to the Ontario Bar in 1979."

In 2002, LaForme served on the Ontario Divisional Court panel that ruled that denying same-sex couples the right to marry was a violation of their civil rights; his suggestion – that marriage be redefined – was subsequently adopted by the Court of Appeal for Ontario.

== Career ==
After graduating from Osgoode Hall Law School in Toronto in 1977, he articled at Osler, Hoskin and Harcourt and was called to the Ontario Bar in 1979. He joined the firm's corporate commercial law practice briefly as an associate, and then started his own practice to focus on Aboriginal law. During that time, he litigated and was known for constitutional law and the Canadian Charter of Rights and Freedoms. He appeared before all levels of court and represented Aboriginal interests throughout Canada and abroad, including in Geneva, Switzerland, New Zealand, and the British Parliament.

Justice LaForme was appointed Commissioner of the Indian Commission of Ontario in 1989 and then Chief Commissioner of the Federal Indian Claims Commission from 1992 to 1994. From October 1989 to June 1990 Justice LaForme also co-chaired the independent National Chiefs Task Force on Native Land Claims.

He taught at Osgoode Hall Law School in 1992 and 1993, after which he was appointed to serve as an Ontario Court of Justice (General Division) Judge in 1994. At the time, only two other Aboriginal people had ever been appointed to this level of trial court in Canada. Justice LaForme was appointed to the Ontario Court of Appeal in 2004, being the first Aboriginal person ever to sit on any appellate court in Canada. He left the Court of Appeal to serve as first Chair named to the Indian Residential Schools Truth and Reconciliation Commission regarding Aboriginal peoples. On October 20, 2008 he resigned citing insubordination and returned to the Court of Appeal for Ontario, where he worked as a judge until he retired in October 2018.

== Honours ==
Justice LaForme's own Aboriginal people have recognized his accomplishments with honours such as the 1997 National Aboriginal Achievement Award in the area of Law and Justice and presenting him with at least 6 Eagle Feathers, which symbolize the virtues of honesty, integrity, and respect. Aboriginal elders bestowed these and other honours upon Justice LaForme on different occasions, including when he was sworn in as an Appellate Judge.

In 2007, a $500 first year law student bursary was established in his name at the University of Windsor. Justice LaForme was an Olympic Torch carrier for the 2010 Canada Winter Olympic Games.

In 2013, Justice LaForme was awarded an honorary doctorate in education at Nipissing University.

In 2017, Justice LaForme was awarded an honorary doctorate of laws, honoris causa (lld) by the Law Society of Upper Canada at its Call to the Bar Ceremony in Toronto.

LaForme was appointed to the Order of Canada in 2022, with the rank of Officer.

In 2025, LaForme delivered a keynote address at Tel Aviv University's Annual Democracy Forum. He expressed his feelings of "deep kinship" with the Jewish people and their "ancestral homeland".

== Publications ==
- LaForme, Harry S. (1991). "Indian Sovereignty: What Does it Mean?". Canadian Journal of Native Studies. 11 (2): 253–266.
- LaForme, Harry (2013). "Resetting the Aboriginal Canadian Relationship: Musings on Reconciliation" (PDF). Ontario Bar Association: A Branch of the Canadian Bar Association: Aboriginal Law Section.
