= Garth Rowswell =

Canadian politician

Garth Rowswell MLA

Member of the Legislative Assembly of Alberta for Vermilion-Lloydminster-Wainwright
- Incumbent
- Assumed office April 16, 2019

Personal details
- Party: United Conservative Party
- Occupation: Financial Advisor

Garth Rowswell is a Canadian politician who was elected in the 2019 Alberta general election to represent the electoral district of Vermilion-Lloydminster-Wainwright in the 30th Alberta Legislature. He is a member of the United Conservative Party.

== Background ==
Prior to his election as a member of the Legislative Assembly of Alberta, Rowswell worked with the financial services firm Edward Jones Investments as a financial advisor. In addition to this financial experience, Rowswell has a background in the agricultural industry. After moving to the Vermillion area in 1990, Rowswell acquired the farm supply company Valley Fertilizers and worked in various management capacities for other agricultural businesses. Eventually Rowswell became the President of the Canadian Association of Agri-Retailers. Rowswell graduated from the University of Alberta with a Bachelor of Science in agriculture.

Rowswell's volunteer experience includes serving as the president of the Vermillion Vipers Swim Club, the Vermillion Curling Club and as a member of the Vermillion and Lloydminster chambers of commerce. Rowswell is a Rotarian and served as the president of the Rotary Club of Lloydminster.

Rowswell is married and the father of two daughters.

== Political career ==
Rowswell has been an advocate of business and industry in his elected office. Reducing red tape and regulation was a key element of Rowswell's plan prior to his election. Rowswell spoke to the increase in tax revenues accrued by the Government of Alberta upon the reduction in the corporate tax rate. In addition, Rowswell promoted the need to support businesses in the province during the COVID-19 pandemic.

Garth Rowswell was one of sixteen United Conservative Party MLAs expressing disagreement with the government's approach to the COVID-19 pandemic. Citing concerns by his constituents, Rowswell added his own signature to the existing fifteen which he announced in a Facebook post.

During his time as an elected member Garth Rowswell has served as the Chair of the Standing Committee on the Alberta Heritage Trust Fund twice as well as the Alberta First Cabinet Policy Committee. In addition to this service, he has been a member of the Standing Committee on Alberta's Economic Future, the Select Special Committee on Real Property Rights, the Standing Committee on Public accounts and the Select Special Public Health Act Review Committee among others.

He will not seek re-election in the next provincial election.

== Electoral history ==
=== 2023 general election ===
2023 Alberta general election: Vermilion-Lloydminster-Wainwright
| Party | Candidate | Votes | % | ±% |
|---|---|---|---|---|
| United Conservative | Garth Rowswell | 13,097 | 74.40 | -4.44 |
| New Democratic | Dawn Flaata | 3,075 | 17.47 | +7.54 |
| Alberta Party | Darrell Dunn | 475 | 2.70 | -3.74 |
| Wildrose Loyalty Coalition | Danny Hozack | 460 | 2.61 | – |
| Independent | Matthew Powell | 351 | 1.99 | – |
| Green | Tigra-Lee Campbell | 146 | 0.83 | – |
| Total | | 17,604 | 99.59 | – |
| Rejected and declined | | 73 | 0.41 | |
| Turnout | | 17,677 | 52.40 | |
| Eligible voters | | 33,733 | | |
| United Conservative hold | | Swing | | -5.99 |
Source(s) Source: Elections Alberta

=== 2019 general election ===
2019 Alberta general election: Vermilion-Lloydminster-Wainwright
| Party | Candidate | Votes | % | ±% |
|---|---|---|---|---|
| United Conservative | Garth Rowswell | 19,768 | 78.84% | -1.27 |
| New Democratic | Ryan Clarke | 2,490 | 9.93% | -8.71 |
| Alberta Party | Craig G. Peterson | 1,615 | 6.44% | – |
| Freedom Conservative | Jim Mckinnon | 898 | 3.58% | – |
| Alberta Advantage Party | Kelly Zeleny | 170 | 0.68% | – |
| Independent | Robert McFadzean | 133 | 0.53% | – |
| Total | | 25,074 | – | – |
| Rejected, spoiled and declined | | 79 | – | – |
| Eligible electors / turnout | | 31,465 | 79.94% | – |
| United Conservative pickup new district. | | | | |
Source(s) Source: "86 - Vermilion-Lloydminster-Wainwright, 2019 Alberta general election". officialresults.elections.ab.ca. Elections Alberta.
