= Manitoba Provincial Judges Association =

The Manitoba Provincial Judges Association is an organization that represents the interests of provincial judges in Manitoba, Canada.
