= Indian Residential Schools Settlement Agreement =

Canadian settlement

The Indian Residential Schools Settlement Agreement (IRSSA; French: Convention de règlement relative aux pensionnats indiens, CRRPI) is an agreement between the government of Canada and approximately 86,000 Indigenous peoples in Canada who at some point were enrolled as children in the Canadian Indian residential school system, a system which was in place between 1879 and 1997. The IRSSA recognized the damage inflicted by the residential schools and established a C$1.9-billion compensation package called CEP (Common Experience Payment) for all former IRS students. The agreement, announced in 2006, was the largest class action settlement in Canadian history. The conduct of certain class action lawyers resulted in criticisms of unethical and exploitative practices, including calls to re-evaluate the codes of conduct of the legal profession by the Canadian Bar Association.

As of March 2016, a total of C$1,622,422,106 has been paid to 79,309 former students. An additional C$3.18 billion has been paid out to 31,103 former students as of March 31, 2019, through IAPs (Independent Assessment Process) which are for damages suffered beyond the norm for the IRS. The average IAP payment is $111,265 (including legal costs), and the average CEP payment is $20,457.

== Indian residential schools ==
Indian residential schools were a network of "boarding schools" for Native Canadians (First Nations or "Indians"; Métis and Inuit). These schools operated in all Canadian provinces and territories except Prince Edward Island and New Brunswick.

The first school opened in 1828, and the last one closed in 1997. The last school to close was Kivalliq Hall in Rankin Inlet, in what is now Nunavut; it became an IRSSA-recognized school in 2019 following a court ruling, which is why earlier accounts describe the last school closing in 1996.

Funded by the Canadian government's Indian Affairs and Northern Development, and administered by Christian churches, predominantly the Roman Catholic Church in Canada (60%), but also the Anglican Church of Canada (30%), and the United Church of Canada, including its pre-1925 constituent church predecessors (10%). The policy was to remove children from the influence of their families and culture and assimilate them into the dominant Canadian culture. Over the course of the system's existence, approximately 30% of native children, roughly some 150,000, were placed in residential schools nationally.

== History of the IRSSA ==
In November 1996, the Royal Commission on Aboriginal Peoples (RCAP) issued its final 4,000-page report with 440 recommendations. Indian residential schools were the topic of one chapter. In 1998 in response to the RCAP the Canadian federal government unveiled Gathering Strength: Canada's Aboriginal Action Plan, a "long-term, broad-based policy approach in response to the Royal Commission on Aboriginal Peoples which included the "Statement of Reconciliation: Learning from the Past," in which the "Government of Canada recognizes and apologizes to those who experienced physical and sexual abuse at Indian residential schools and acknowledges its role in the development and administration of residential schools."

In 2001, the federal Office of Indian Residential Schools Resolution Canada was created to manage and resolve the large number of abuse claims filed by former students against the federal government. In 2004, an Assembly of First Nations Report on Canada's Dispute Resolution Plan to Compensate for Abuses in Indian Residential Schools led to discussions to develop a holistic, fair and lasting resolution of the legacy of Indian Residential Schools.

The law firm of Regina, Saskatchewan lawyer, Tony Merchant, Q.C.—Merchant Law Group LLP—represented over 7,000 survivors—approximately 50 per cent of "all known" residential school survivors in Canada "who had pursued class action lawsuits" against the Canadian federal government . Following the publication of the 1996 Royal Commission on Aboriginal Peoples report, residential school survivors met across the country at gatherings, also attended by Tony Merchant, who became a "familiar figure", signing up thousands of survivors for a class action lawsuit. MLG lawyers received "nothing until a class action settlement was secured" in a legal fees agreement that was settlement-driven. David Blott's Calgary, Alberta-based law firm "handled almost 4,600 residential school claims."

On November 20, 2005, an agreement in principle was reached by the negotiating parties which included Canada, as represented by Frank Iacobucci, a retired Supreme Court of Canada Justice, the plaintiffs' representative—the National Consortium and the Merchant Law Group (MLG), independent Counsel, the Assembly of First Nations, Inuit representatives, the General Synod of the Anglican Church of Canada, the Presbyterian Church in Canada, the United Church of Canada, and Roman Catholic Entities for the "resolution of the legacy of Indian Residential Schools."

On 23 November 2005 the Canadian federal government announced the IRSSA compensation package. It represents the largest class-action lawsuit in Canadian history. On 11 June 2008, Prime Minister Harper "apologized on behalf of the Government of Canada, and all Canadians, for the forcible removal of Aboriginal children from their homes and communities to attend Indian residential schools. In this historic Apology, the Prime Minister recognized that there is no room in Canada for the attitudes that created the residential school system to prevail."

In Regina, Saskatchewan, on December 15, 2006, Justice Dennis Ball, approved the "settlement of class and individual residential school claims" under the IRSSA.

== Components of the IRSSA ==
The agreement was signed on May 8, 2006, with implementation on September 19, 2007.

=== Federal government contributions ===
The five main components of the IRSSA provided by the federal government were the Common Experience Payment (CEP), Independent Assessment Process (IAP), the Truth and Reconciliation Commission (TRC), Commemoration, and Health and Healing Services.

==== Common Experience Payment (CEP) ====
The IRSSA offered former students blanket compensation through the Common Experience Payment (CEP) with an average lump-sum payment of C$28,000. The CEP, a component of the Indian Residential Schools Settlement Agreement, totaling C$1.9 billion, was "part of an overall holistic and comprehensive response to the Indian residential school legacy." Payments were higher for more serious cases of abuse. The CEP recognized "the experience of living at an Indian Residential School(s) and its impacts. All former students who resided at a recognized Indian Residential School(s) and were alive on May 30, 2005 were eligible for the CEP. This include[d] First Nations, Métis, and Inuit former students." This initial payment for each person who attended a residential school amounted to C$10,000 per person plus C$3,000 per year. The application deadline for CEP was 19 September 2011 with some exceptions made until September 19, 2012. By 31 December 2012, "a total of 105,540 applications were received under the common experience payment. C$1.62 billion was paid to "78,750 recipients, representing 98% of the 80,000 estimated eligible former students."

==== Independent Assessment Process ====
The IRSSA allotted C$960 million to the Independent Assessment Process (IAP), "a settlement fund for claims of sexual abuses, serious physical abuse and other wrongful acts" at IRS which "provides money to those who experienced serious physical and/or sexual abuse at an Indian Residential School (...) The maximum payment is C$275,000, but an additional C$250,000 may be awarded for claims of actual income loss." By 31 December 2012, over C$1.7 billion in total was issued through the IAP. around three times more applications were received than expected, and the IAP is forecast to continue hearings until around 2017. By 2011 there were already 29,000 claims, double the 12,500 originally estimated by the IRSSA and this number was expected to rise even more. Violent abuse was "rampant, not isolated." According to Dan Ish, Indian Residential School Adjudication Secretariat chief adjudicator for the IAP, estimated in 2012 that IAP claims would be somewhere between two and three billion dollars more than anticipated.

The fate of the records documenting over 38,000 IAP claims was placed in front of Canadian courts. The Supreme Court of Canada decided that on September 19, 2027, all records generated through IAP will be destroyed unless the Survivor mentioned in the record indicates that they wish the record is preserved. The Supreme Court decision indicated that IAP records can only be requested for preservation by Survivors. Family members are unable to ask for records to be saved, meaning that IAP records of people who have died since the time of their IAP claim and before this process was established, will not be saved.

==== Indian Residential Schools Truth and Reconciliation Commission ====
IRSSA allocated C$60 million for the Truth and Reconciliation Commission (TRC) to document and preserve the experiences of survivors. The commission was launched 2 June 2008. On 20 October 2008, Justice Harry LaForme, Commission chair resigned, claiming "the commission was on the verge of paralysis and doomed to failure. He cited an "incurable problem" with the other two commissioners — Claudette Dumont-Smith and Jane Brewin Morley — who he said refused to accept his authority as chairman and were disrespectful." On 15 October 2009 the Indian Residential Schools Truth and Reconciliation Commission was relaunched by then-Governor General Michaëlle Jean with Justice Murray Sinclair, an Ojibway-Canadian judge, First Nations lawyer, as the chair. By August 2012, the federal government had released over 941,000 documents to the TRC related to residential schools.

==== Health and Healing Services ====
On 31 March 1998 in response to the RCAP and as part of Gathering Strength—Canada's Aboriginal Action Plan, the federal government established the Aboriginal Healing Foundation (AHF), an "Aboriginal-managed, national, Ottawa-based, not-for-profit private corporation", with a C$350 million-dollar grant and an eleven-year mandate from March 1998 to March 2009. Its role was "to encourage and support, through research and funding contributions, community-based Aboriginal directed healing initiatives which address the legacy of physical and sexual abuse suffered in Canada’s Indian Residential School System, including inter-generational impacts." In 2007, under the IRSSA, the federal government provided $125 million to the AHF, which was intended to provide five years of funding. Further funding was to come from the money paid by the Catholic entities under section 3.3 of Schedule O-3, of which at least 80% was to be transferred to the AHF. A court dispute over the amount of money due to the AHF because of this obligation subsequently arose between the government and the Catholic entities.

IRSSA also supported the Resolution Health Support Worker (RHSW) Program.

==== Commemoration Fund ====
The IRSSA allocated C$20 million for the Commemoration Fund for national and community commemorative projects. This fund was managed by the TRC and Aboriginal Affairs and Northern Development Canada.

=== Church contributions ===
The church entities signed agreements to provide financial and in-kind support for healing and reconciliation programs, as outlined in the following table. Compensation payments made prior to the implementation of the IRSSA were credited against these obligations.

		Denomination			
		Presbyterian	Anglican	Catholic	United
IRSSA Schedule		O-1	O-2	O-3	O-4
Commitments under prior agreements (replaced by IRSSA commitments)		$2,100,000	$25,000,000	—	—
Amounts paid out in compensation as of Nov. 20, 2005 and explicitly noted in respective Schedules		$227,412	$6,699,125	Not stated in Schedule O-3	$5,444,420
Cumulative amounts paid out in compensation prior to IRSSA implementation (Sep. 2007)		At least $366,894 (Note: $366,894 had been paid out as of March 2006.)	At least $7,698,419 (Note: $7,698,419 had been paid out as of February 2006.)	$8,344,575	⪆ $5,996,000 (Note: Approximately $5,996,000 had been paid out as of March 2006.)
Total commitments under IRSSA	Maximum	$1,317,700 (Note: The Joint Factum of the Plaintiffs gives a figure of $1,317,000.)	$15,687,188 (Note: $15,687,188 is presented as the result of a computation based on the maximum possible contribution of the Catholic entities: $79,000,000 × 19.8572%. The Factum of the Protestant Church Entities gives a figure of $15,687,100, while the Joint Factum of the Plaintiffs gives a figure of $15,689,100. $6,699,125 + $4,964,300 + $4,023,675 = $15,687,100, not $15,687,188.)	$79,000,000	$6,891,170
Total commitments under IRSSA	Minimum	$900,700	$12,922,800 (Note: For the cash contribution formula, it appears that P reached $2,200,000 by the IRSSA implementation date, giving a minimum total commitment of $2,200,000 + $4,023,675 + $6,699,125 = $12,922,800.)	$54,000,000	$6,455,020
Components of commitments	Credit for previous compensation payments	Used in computation of reduced settlement amount of $1,317,700 If amount paid between Nov. 20, 2005 and the IRSSA implementation date in excess of $489,540, Government to pay excess amount for use in settlement fund	$6,699,125 included in total above; further amounts paid between Nov. 20, 2005 and the IRSSA implementation date refunded by Government and used as P in formula below	Deducted from $29,000,000 cash commitment	$5,444,420 credited against the cash and in-kind services obligations; further amounts paid between Nov. 20, 2005 and the IRSSA implementation date refunded by Government; up to $1,010,600 of any refund to be used for healing and reconciliation grants in accordance with agreement
Components of commitments	Cash	Total amount above less any amount provided as in-kind services	$\max(\min(P, 2200000), 0.198572F)$, where P is the amount of compensation paid by Anglican Entities between Nov. 20, 2005 and the IRSSA implementation date, and F is the amount raised by the Catholic fundraising campaign. Maximum contribution: $4,964,300	$20,655,425 ($29,000,000, less $8,344,575 paid before IRSSA implementation)	$4,710,420 if Catholic fundraising campaign raised over $20 million; $4,274,270 otherwise
Components of commitments	In-kind services	Up to $417,000	$4,023,675 (cash may be substituted for services)	$25,000,000	$2,180,750
Components of commitments	Fundraising	—	—	7-year (2007–2014) (Note: The Catholic entities (not including the Diocese of Saskatoon) agreed to "use their best efforts throughout the seven year period following the day after the coming into force of this Agreement". The IRSSA came into effect on September 19, 2007, setting up the "seven year period" for the fundraising obligation to run from September 2007 to September 2014. In a February 2014 affidavit, AANDC senior analyst Pamela Stellick deposed that the campaign was "to end in 2014".) "best efforts" (Note: "Best efforts" would be "deemed to have been made where the fund-raising campaign demonstrates on a Canada-Wide level in each of the seven years an approach and means that is consistent with the approach and means used by professionally managed national fundraising campaigns, including those operated by universities and hospital foundations.") campaign with target of $25,000,000	—

== Legal representation ==
Crawford Class Action was the court-appointed administrator. C$100-million was allocated by IRSSA for the payment of plaintiffs’ legal fees.

== Controversies ==
=== Conduct of certain lawyers ===
Dan Ish, upon his retirement from his position as chief adjudicator of IAP, described challenges with private lawyers who allegedly illegally profited from IRSSA benefits. They investigated Winnipeg lawyer Howard Tennenhouse, Calgary lawyer David Blott and Vancouver lawyer Stephen Bronstein and numerous other lawyers. Ish "personally reported Tennenhouse to the Law Society of Manitoba, who eventually disbarred the veteran lawyer and repaid clients nearly a million dollars. A Vancouver judge barred Blott and others he worked with from further IAP work after claimants complained of wrongly being charged loans, fees, penalties and interest-something forbidden under the IAP. In 2013, the IRSAS requested an investigation into Bronstein but settled for a "review" of his practice and alleged connection with a paroled murderer doing IAP intake work." In 2012 the Law Society of Manitoba disbarred Tennenhouse for life. He pleaded guilty to charges and agreed to pay back the "C$950,000 in extra fees" he charged 55 former residential school students. In 2014 as the Law Society of Alberta moved to disbar Calgary lawyer, David Blott "accused of misconduct in his handling of settlements awarded to survivors of residential school abuse", Blott resigned. The "investigation into Blott’s action cost taxpayers C$3.5 million." Ivon Johnny, a convicted killer, had his parole revoked in January 2013 after "allegations he threatened and extorted (...) substantial sums of money from vulnerable and in some cases cognitively deficient [IRSSA] claimants. In February 2013 "B.C. Supreme Court Justice Brenda Brown "ordered Bronstein to be interviewed by a court monitor about his alleged dealings with Johnny."

In January 2015, the office of the Attorney General of Canada launched a lawsuit in the Court of Queen's Bench for Saskatchewan, in Regina, Saskatchewan, on behalf of the Canadian federal government, against Tony Merchant's Regina, Saskatchewan-based Merchant Law Group. Tony Merchant, Q.C., who "is known as the king of class action lawsuits in Canada," and Merchant Law Group LLP had successfully represented about fifty per cent of "all known individuals in Canada pursuing class action lawsuits" against the Canadian federal government as survivors of residential schools. In November 2005, they were part of the negotiating teams that culminated in the multi-billion National Settlement with the Canadian Government−C$1.9 Billion in compensation for Common Experience Payments" and C$3 billion in Independent Assessment Process (IAP) compensation. The 2015 case against MLG was first launched at the Queen's Court, and appealed at the Court of Appeal before it was heard by the Supreme Court of Canada in 2018. The March 15, 2018 ruling by the Supreme Court of Canada rejected MLG's appeal to have the fraud action struck down, which means the government of Canada can continue with its damages suit against the law firm.

On August 2, 2018, the Supreme Court of Canada dismissed Merchant Law Group (MLG)'s appeal to retain C$21,310.83 of a residential school survivor's compensation" for "outstanding legal bills." The survivor's January 2014 C$93,000 IRSSA Independent Assessment Process (IAP) compensation is protected under a 2006 Supreme Court of British Columbia the IRSSA and the Financial Administration Act. Under that Act, lawyers are "expressly forbidden to assign any part of IAP compensation"..."because IAP claimants were considered especially vulnerable." Since 2000, MLG had represented the client and her son. The adjudication secretariat routinely checking IAP files found the deduction for the previous legal bills." When Merchant was told to return the money to the claimant, he appealed to retain the money for legal fees. In October 2020, the Law Society of Saskatchewan announced their decision to suspend Merchant for eight months, saying that because of the woman's vulnerability, Merchant "should have known better" than to use a disrespectful, and intimidating tone with her, compelling her to sign a form authorizing Merchant to retain her IAP claim to pay for "unrelated legal bills owed by her son." The disciplinary panel said the suspension will start in February 2021 and that Merchant must also pay over C$10,000 in costs. According to an October 2, 2020 Regina Leader Post article, MLG submitted a statement of appeal to the Saskatchewan Court of Appeal to overturn the disciplinary panel's decision, and to overturn the suspension.

=== Legal dispute between Canadian government and Catholic entities ===
In July 2015, the Court of Queen's Bench for Saskatchewan found that the Government of Canada, the Catholic entities party to the IRSSA, and the Corporation of Catholic Entities Party to the IRSSA (CCEPIRSS) had reached "an enforceable settlement of all issues between these parties relating to CCEPIRSS' obligations under the Settlement Agreement." The case became controversial because The Globe and Mail, and subsequently CBC News, claimed that the decision had enabled the Catholic entities to escape one or more of their IRSSA obligations that allegedly had not been met. Canadian Catholic authorities have maintained that all the obligations were met.

The government began an appeal of the judgment, then dropped it; this decision became a further topic of controversy because their reason for not pursuing the appeal remained obscure for years. Documents released under the Access to Information Act in 2022 revealed that the government had concluded that an appeal would be unlikely to succeed.

== See also ==
- Canadian genocide of Indigenous peoples
- Residential school denialism
- Indian hospitals
- Media portrayals of the Canadian Indian residential school system
- Missing and Murdered Indigenous Women
- Settler colonialism in Canada
