= Media portrayals of the Canadian Indian residential school system =

The list of media portrayals of the Canadian Indian residential school system includes examples of works created to highlight the Canadian Indian residential school system, a network of schools established by the Canadian government and administered by church officials to assimilate Indigenous students.

== Film and television ==
Year	Title	Type	Director / producer	Notes
1978	Wandering Spirit Survival School	Short	Marvin Midwicki, Les Holdway and Christopher Wilson	Produced by the National Film Board, the short film examines a school, organized by parents, that introduced subjects of particular relevance to its pupils. The experience of the children in the school is contrasted with the experienced lived by their parents in residential schools.
1985	The Mission School Syndrome	Documentary feature	Northern Native Broadcasting	A documentary feature that investigates the effect of residential schools in the Yukon, focusing on former residents of the Lower Post Residential School, the Baptist Indian Mission School (Whitehorse), and the Chaoutla Indian Residential School (Carcross), as well as the Yukon Hall Residence in Whitehorse.
1989	Where the Spirit Lives	Television film	Bruce Pittman	A CBC dramatic portrayal of a young Aboriginal girl, Ashtoh-Komi, who is abducted and taken to a residential school in the 1930s.
1991	The Learning Path	Documentary feature	Loretta Todd	A documentary following three Aboriginal women educators and includes the harrowing experiences that two of the women faced in residential schools. Using a blend of documentary footage, dramatic re-enactments, and archival film, the film brings together the life stories of three unsung heroines who are helping to restore Aboriginal control over education.
1991	Violation of Trust	News magazine episode	The Fifth Estate	A documentary about Canada's worst-kept secret, examining the lives of residential school survivors, along with stories of abuse.
1992	Sleeping Children Awake	Documentary short	Rhonda Kara Hanah	Inspired by Shirley Cheechoo's 1991 play Path with no Moccasins, Sleeping Children Awake is both a personal record of Canada's history, and a tribute to the enduring strength of Native cultures.
1993	Beyond the Shadows	Documentary short	Gryphon Productions Ltd.	A documentary about the legacy of residential schools, looking at the work of the Cariboo Tribal Council in addressing the impact of residential schools on their people. It touches on the historical background of these schools, though primarily depicting painful personal experiences; the causes of multi-generational grief and healing processes underway in communities today.
1998	Kuper Island: Return to the Healing Circle	Documentary short	Christine Welsh and Peter C. Campbell	Former residents of Kuper Island speak out to break the silence about their experience and trauma of the Kuper Island Indian Residential School. Produced by the National Film Board.
2001	Childhood Lost: The Residential School Experience	Documentary short	Doug Cuthand	Through interviews, archival photos, and re-enactments, this program illuminates the experiences of four individuals who were sent to residential schools when they were very young.
2005	A Day at Indian Residential Schools in Canada	Documentary short	Indigenous Education Coalition	This 26-minute documentary, hosted by youth, explores the life at three Indian residential schools. Survivors recollect their daily routines, time spent on chores, and their feelings of isolation. This film features archival images of life at the schools as well as interviews with survivors who had never before spoken on camera about their experiences.
2007	The Fallen Feather: Indian Industrial Residential Schools Canadian Confederation	Documentary feature	Randy N. Bezeau	A 93-minute documentary that provides an in-depth critical analysis of the driving forces behind the creation of Canadian Indian residential schools.
2007	Unrepentant: Kevin Annett and Canada's Genocide	Documentary feature	Louie Lawless	A documentary describing the crimes committed in church-run residential schools. Based on his book Hidden from History: The Canadian Holocaust, the film is told through the perspective of the titular Kevin Annett, a former minister who blew the whistle on his own church, after he learned of thousands of murders in its residential schools.
2008	Muffins for Granny	Documentary feature	Nadia McLaren (Mongrel Media)	A 88-minute film by Nadia McLaren, who tells the story of her own grandmother by combining precious home-movie clips with the stories of seven elders dramatically affected by their experiences in residential school.
2008	Stolen Children	In-depth TV segment	The National	In this segment from The National, CBC explores the impact of residential schools on former students and the larger community, presenting ideas for what more can be done to address this painful issue.
2009	The Experimental Eskimos	Documentary feature	Barry Greenwald	In the early 1960s, the Canadian government conducted an experiment in social engineering, called the "Eskimo Experiment." Three young Inuit boys were separated from their families in the Arctic and were sent to Ottawa, the nation's capital, to live with white families and to be educated in white schools.
2009	Unseen Tears	Documentary short	Ron Douglas	A 30-minute documentary focusing on Native American families in Western New York and Canada who continue to feel the impact of the Thomas Indian School and the Mohawk Institute in Ontario. Survivors speak of traumatic separation from their families, abuse, and a systematic assault on their language and culture. Western New York Native American communities are presently attempting to heal the wounds and break the cycle of inter-generational trauma resulting from the boarding school experience. Unseen Tears documents testimonies of boarding school survivors, their families, and social service providers.
2009	Kakalakkuvik (Where the Children Dwell)	Documentary short	Jobie Weetaluktuk	A 26-minute documentary recounting the vivid memories of former students from Port Harrison (now Inukjuak, Quebec), the first group of Inuit to sue the federal government for compensation.
2009	Savage	Short film	Lisa Jackson	In a subversion of the traditional residential school narrative, a group of First Nations children in a residential school break out into choreographed hip hop dance routines whenever they are unsupervised.
2009	Shi-Shi-Etko	Short film	Kate Kroll	A 12-minute fictional short about Shi-Shi-Etko, a girl who will soon be taken away from her home to begin her formal western education at a residential school. Her mother, father and grandmother want her to remember her roots and they wait for her return in the spring to continue passing down those ideals to her.
2009	Against the Grain	Documentary short	Curtis Mandeville	A 24-min documentary in which survivors of the Indian residential school system "attempt to cope with its impact on their personal lives and communities."
2012	We Were Children	Documentary feature	Tim Wolochatiuk	Documentary film about the experiences of survivors Lyna Hart (Guy Hill Residential School) and Glen Anaquod (Lebret Indian Residential School).
2013	Rhymes for Young Ghouls	Feature film	Jeff Barnaby	A fictional film about teenager Aila, who runs a drug crew on her reserve, and is assaulted by an Indian Affairs agent who then detains her in a residential school, where other children are frequently abused.
2016	Secret Path	Short film, animated	Gord Downie	Animated retelling of the story of Chanie Wenjack.
2016	Snip	Animated short	Terril Calder	Story about two time-travelling children who attempt to rescue Chanie Wenjack.
2017	Indian Horse	Feature film	Stephen Campanelli	Adaptation of the 2012 novel Indian Horse by Richard Wagamese; a boy in the residential school system survives and thrives by excelling at ice hockey.
2019	Great and Sudden Change (Anne with an E, S3)	TV episode	Moira Walley-Beckett	Adaptation of the 1908 novel Anne of Green Gables by Lucy Maud Montgomery. A fictional story arc involving a young Miꞌkmaq girl forcibly separated from her family and taken to a residential school under false pretences.
2021	Returning Home	Documentary	Sean Stiller	Profile of Phyllis Webstad.
2021	Honour to Senator Murray Sinclair	Documentary	Alanis Obomsawin	Blends excerpts from a speech by Murray Sinclair with testimonies from other Indian residential school survivors.
2022	Bones of Crows	Feature film	Marie Clements	A fictional film about the life of a Cree girl, Aline, who is sent to a residential school along with her siblings.
2023	WaaPaKe	Documentary	Jules Arita Koostachin	Documentary about the ongoing intergenerational effects of the residential school system on not just the direct survivors, but their children and grandchildren.
2024	Sugarcane (film)	Documentary feature	Julian Brave NoiseCat Emily Kassie	An investigation into abuse and missing children at an Indian residential school in Canada ignites a reckoning on the nearby Sugarcane Reserve.

== Published texts ==
Year	Title	Author	ISBN	Notes
1988	Resistance and Renewal: Surviving the Indian Residential School	Celia Haig-Brown	ISBN 0889781893	One of the first books published to deal with the phenomenon of residential schools in Canada, Resistance and Renewal is a disturbing collection of Native perspectives on the Kamloops Indian Residential School (KIRS) in the British Columbia interior. Interviews with thirteen Natives, all former residents of KIRS, form the nucleus of the book, a frank depiction of school life, and a telling account of the system's oppressive environment which sought to stifle Native culture.
1992	My Name Is Seepeetza	Shirley Sterling	ISBN 0888991657	First published in 1992 in Canada, where it won the Sheila A. Egoff Children's Literature Prize, this autobiographical novel is written in the form of Seepeetza's diary in her Grade 6 year in the 1950s.
1998	Kiss of the Fur Queen	Tomson Highway	ISBN 0385258801	Jeremiah and Gabriel grow into acclaimed artists attempting to work within white, European traditions while retaining the influence of Native culture. The novel follows the boys from the idyllic innocence of their Cree childhood through a forced relocation to an abusive residential school to their lives as young artists attempting to discover how far their natural talents can take them.
2001	No Time to Say Goodbye: Children's Stories of Kuper Island Residential School	Sylvia Olsen	ISBN 1550391216	A fictional account of five children sent to aboriginal boarding school, based on the recollections of a number of Tsartlip First Nations people. These unforgettable children are taken by government agents from Tsartlip Day School to live at Kuper Island Residential School. (Kuper Island was renamed Penelakut Island in 2010.)
2005	Finding My Talk: How Fourteen Canadian Native Women Reclaimed Their Lives After Residential School	Agnes Grant	ISBN 1894856570	Fourteen aboriginal women who attended residential schools, or were affected by them, reflect on their experiences. They describe their years in residential schools across Canada and how they overcame tremendous obstacles to become strong and independent members of aboriginal cultures and valuable members of Canadian society.
2005	Shi-shi-etko	Nicola I. Campbell	ISBN 0888996594	Shi-shi-etko counts down her last four days before going away. She tries to memorize everything about her home–tall grass swaying to the rhythm of the breeze, determined mosquitoes, working bumblebees.
2006	Behind Closed Doors: Stories from the Kamloops Indian Residential School	Jack Agnes (editor)	ISBN 1894778413	Behind Closed Doors features written testimonials from 32 individuals who attended the Kamloops Indian Residential School. The school was one of many infamous residential schools that operated from 1893 to 1979. The storytellers remember and share with us their stolen time at the school; many stories are told through courageous tears.
2007	Moving Beyond: Understanding the Impacts of the Residential Schools	Brent Stonefish	ISBN 1896832814	The residential school system in Canada continues to have a significant impact on Aboriginal people. We continue to struggle with the trauma of this unwanted legacy. In this book, we take a look at the history but focus on the inter-generational impacts that exist today from the residential school system. These lasting impacts affect learning, education, and family relations. "Moving Beyond" highlights positive approaches and paths to healing and promotes the development of healthy individuals, families and communities.
2008	Shin-Chi's Canoe	Nicola I. Campbell	ISBN 0888998570	This moving sequel to the award-winning Shi-shi-etko tells the story of two children's experience at residential school. Shi-shi-etko is about to return for her second year, but this time her six-year-old brother, Shin-chi, is going, too.
2009	Porcupines and China Dolls	Robert Alexie	ISBN 1894778723	Enough alcohol silences the demons for a night; a gun and a single bullet silences demons forever. When a friend commits suicide and a former priest appears on television, the community is shattered. James and Jake confront their childhood abuse and break the silence to begin a journey of healing and rediscovery.
2010	Blue Saltwater	Dan Green	ISBN 1451581246	Haida teen, Blue Saltwater, exposes the evil underbelly of the St. Ignatius Residential School before making a daring escape to return to his island home of Haida Gwaii.
2010	Broken Circle: The Dark Legacy of Indian Residential Schools: A Memoir	Theodore Fontaine	ISBN 192661366X	Sense the oppression and marginalization of culture through an author's 'Healing Journey'.
2010	Fatty Legs: A True Story	Christy Jordan-Fenton and Margaret Pokiak-Fenton	ISBN 1554512468	Taunted and humiliated by Raven, the unkind nun in charge of the young girls, Margaret is willing to endure almost anything as long as she can learn to read. The unpleasant chores do not daunt her, but the teasing of other students and the unfair punishments do. When she is the only girl forced to wear ugly red stockings, however, Margaret has had enough, and fights back.
2010	From Lishamie	Albert Canadien	ISBN 1894778650	Albert Canadien fondly recounts his boyhood years in Lishamie, a traditional Dene camp north of the Mackenzie River, and reflects on the devastating and long-lasting impact residential schooling had on him, his family and his people.
2010	Unrepentant: Disrobing the Emperor	Kevin Annett	ISBN 9781846944055	Anecdotal essays by Kevin Annett, United Church of Canada minister who served at Port Alberni United Church, which had operated the Port Alberni Residential School.
2011	A Stranger at Home: A True Story	Christy Jordan-Fenton and Margaret Pokiak-Fenton	ISBN 1554513618	Travelling to be reunited with her family in the Arctic, 10-year-old Margaret Pokiak can hardly contain her excitement. It has been two years since her parents delivered her to the school run by the dark-cloaked nuns and brothers.
2011	Unsettling the Settler Within: Indian Residential Schools, Truth Telling, and Reconciliation in Canada	Paulette Regan	ISBN 077481778X	Unsettling the Settler Within argues that non-Aboriginal Canadians must undergo their own process of decolonization in order to truly participate in the transformative possibilities of reconciliation. Settlers must relinquish the persistent myth of themselves as peacemakers and acknowledge the destructive legacy of a society that has stubbornly ignored and devalued Indigenous experience. A compassionate call to action, this powerful book offers a new and hopeful path toward healing the wounds of the past.
2012	Indian Horse	Richard Wagamese	ISBN 9781553654025	A young Ojibwe boy named Saul Indian Horse is taken to St. Jerome's Indian Residential School in White River, Ontario. The novel focuses on Saul's experiences at the school and the escape he finds through playing hockey.
2012	They Called Me Number One: Secrets and Survival at an Indian Residential School	Bev Sellars	ISBN 0889227411	In this frank and poignant memoir of her years at St. Joseph's Mission, Sellars breaks her silence about the residential school's lasting effects on her and her family-from substance abuse to suicide attempts-and eloquently articulates her own path to healing.
2014	Back to the Red Road	Florence Kaefer and Edward Gamblin	ISBN 1927575370	In 1954, when Florence Kaefer was just 19, she accepted a job as a teacher at Norway House. Unaware of the difficult conditions the students were enduring, Florence and her fellow teachers nurtured a school full of lonely and homesick young children. Many years later Florence unexpectedly reconnected with one of her Norway House students, Edward Gamblin. Motivated to apologize on behalf of the school and her colleagues, Florence contacted Edward.
2014	Indian School Road: Legacies of the Shubenacadie Residential School	Chris Benjamin	ISBN 1771082135	In Indian School Road, journalist Chris Benjamin tackles the controversial and tragic history of the Shubenacadie Indian Residential School, its predecessors, and its lasting effects, giving voice to multiple perspectives for the first time.
2014	On the Goose: A Labrador Metis Woman Remembers	Josie Penny	ISBN 1459719123	Josie Penny's life as part of a loving Métis family in an isolated corner of Labrador changed dramatically when she was taken away to a residential school. Abused by the students, Josie became increasingly angry and isolated from her family and community as she grew into her teens. At 17, she left for Goose Bay to make her fortune and start her own life.
2014	Up Ghost River: A Chief's Journey Through the Turbulent Waters of Native History	Edmund Metatawabin and Alexandra Shimo	ISBN 0307399877	In the 1950s, 7-year-old Edmund Metatawabin was separated from his family and placed in one of Canada's worst residential schools. Fuelled by alcohol, the trauma from his past caught up with him, and his family and work lives imploded. Now Metatawabin's mission is to help the next generation of residential school survivors.
2015	The Education of Augie Merasty: A Residential School Memoir	Joseph Auguste (Augie) Merasty with David Carpenter	ISBN 0889773688	Merasty attended St. Therese Residential School in the community of Sturgeon Landing, Manitoba, from 1935 to 1944. As Merasty recounts, these schools did more than attempt to mold children in the ways of white society. They were taught to be ashamed of their native heritage and, as he experienced, often suffered physical and sexual abuse. Even as he looks back on this painful part of his childhood, Merasty's generous and authentic voice shines through.
2016	Wenjack	Joseph Boyden	ISBN 0735233381	The story of Ojibwe boy Chanie Wenjack who attempted to escape from a Northern Ontario residential school. On his ill-fated journey he is followed by "Manitous", the spirit of the forest.
2016	Secret Path	Gord Downie and Jeff Lemire	ISBN 9781501155949	Graphic novel about Chanie Wenjack, accompanying the album and animated film of the same name.
2019	Father Sweet	J.J. Martin	ISBN 9781459743960	A settler survivor of clerical sexual abuse learns his father worked as an Indian Agent and helped manage Residential Schools and the Sixties Scoop.
2020	Five Little Indians	Michelle Good	ISBN 9781443459181	Novel about five survivors of the residential school system struggling to adapt to life in the outside world after being released.
2021	All the Quiet Places	Brian Thomas Isaac	ISBN 9781990071027	
2022	Aki-wayn-zih: A Person as Worthy as the Earth	Eli Baxter	ISBN 9780228008071	Memoir of the author's personal experiences in the residential school system.

== Stage ==
Year	Title	Writer	Notes
2008, 2012	Where the Blood Mixes	Kevin Loring	The play treats the themes of family, loss, redemption and healing as two residential school survivors confront their pasts when one's daughter, Christine, returns to Kumsheen after 20 years, to discover her family and her past. It won the 2009 Governor General's Literary Award.
2014	Going Home Star - Truth and Reconciliation	Joseph Boyden	Commissioned by the Royal Winnipeg Ballet, with the support of the Truth and Reconciliation Commission of Canada, this play explores the world of Annie, a young, urban First Nations woman adrift in a contemporary life of youthful excess. But when she meets Gordon, a long-haired trickster disguised as a homeless man, she's propelled into a world she's always sensed but never seen. Not only do they travel the streets of this place but also the roads of their ancestors, learning to accept the other's burdens as the two walk through the past and toward the future. Together, both Annie and Gordon learn that without truth, there is no reconciliation.
2016	Reckoning	Tara Beagan	Reckoning is a triptych of stories about survivors and responses to the residential school system: "The first section, involving both text and movement, focuses on an adjudicator hearing the testimony of former school residents and the anxiety he feels as he deals with their statements. The second ... is a naturalistic two-hander involving two native people who meet online through a support group of IRS survivors and children of survivors. The third, a monologue, is part live video document and part attempt to right wrongs."
