= Macfarlane River =

Macfarlane River or MacFarlane River may refer to:

- MacFarlane River (Ontario) in Ontario, Canada
- MacFarlane River (Saskatchewan) in Saskatchewan, Canada
- Macfarlane River (New Zealand)
