= Ontario Central Airlines =

Canadian airline

Ontario Central Airlines Nunasi-Central Airlines
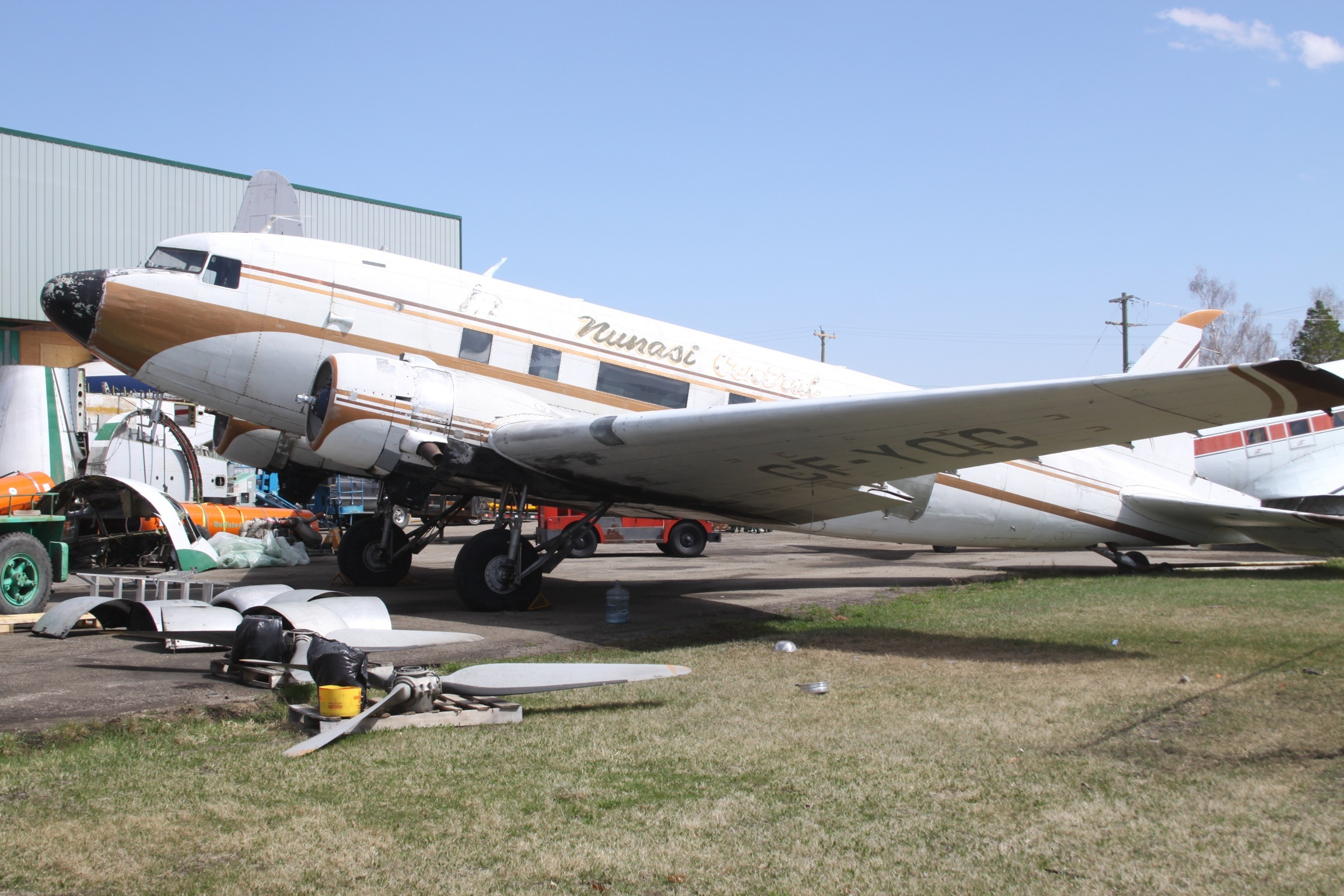
- Nunasi-Central Douglas DC-3 CF-YQG
IATA	ICAO	Call sign
—	NUN	NUNASI
- Founded: 1947
- Commenced operations: 1957
- Ceased operations: 1991
- Operating bases: Kenora Airport
- Fleet size: 22 (1963)
- Destinations: Ball Lake Airport, Red Lake Airport
- Key people: Don Watson; Barney E. Lamm; Rex A. Kiteley; Stanley Matthew Deluce

Ontario Central Airlines was a Canadian airline headquartered in Kenora, Ontario. It was founded in 1947 and served the Kenora District. It operated a wide range of aircraft, ranging from outdated passenger planes like the Douglas DC-3 to small bush planes like the Noorduyn Norseman.

The airline was renamed Nunasi-Central Airlines in 1984 and Nunasi-Northland Airlines in 1987. It ceased operations in 1991.

== History ==
Ontario Central Airlines was founded in 1947, starting with two Fairchild 82 aircraft. Founded as a charter airline, Ontario Central introduced its first scheduled services in 1957, having purchased a Beechcraft 18 (CF-KIA). The first two routes were from Kenora to Winnipeg, Manitoba and return, and from Kenora to Fort Frances, Atikokan and Fort William and return. These services were discontinued in the summer of 1958.

In 1963, its president was Barney E. Lamm and its vice president was Rex A. Kiteley. In 1976, the airline was bought by entrepreneur Stanley Matthew Deluce.

A large number of Ontario Central Airlines' aircraft were Noorduyn Norseman bush planes. One specific Norseman, CF-OBE, was completely metalized using metal from the wings of another Norseman, CF-UUD, thus making it one of two all-metal Norseman planes, the other being CF-UUD. CF-OBE suffered substantial damage while attempting to land at Birch Lake Lodge, 120 kilometers north of Red Lake, in 2004. As of 2005, the wreckage is still ashore at Birch Lake Lodge.

In December 1984, Ontario Central Airlines was renamed Nunasi-Central Airlines. Nunasi-Central Airlines was allocated the ICAO Code NUN and used the callsign NUNASI. In 1987, Nunasi-Central Airlines was renamed Nunasi-Northland Airlines.

Nunasi-Northland Airlines ceased operations in 1991. Several of its former aircraft survived into the 21st century, and some are now in the hands of private collectors and other airlines. Others are on display in aviation museums, such as CF-AXL, a Fairchild 82 that is currently preserved at the Canada Aviation and Space Museum in Ottawa.

== Services ==
The airline operated amphibious flights from Kenora, Ball Lake, and Red Lake in Ontario. The airline also engaged in aerial advertising and pest control services.

Ontario Central Airlines operated a maintenance facility in Redditt. It was a former Canadian National Railway roundhouse that was extensively modified to fit the needs of the airline. The switch yard was used as a landing strip for wheel aircraft after the tracks had been pulled. the inflow to Corn Lake was dredged, and a control dam was constructed at the outflow of Ena Lake to ensure an adequate water depth for the landing of amphibious aircraft, which were then towed by a dolly to the roundhouse for maintenance.

== Fleet ==
Over its 44-year existence, Ontario Central Airlines and its successors operated the following aircraft in its fleet, many of which were surplus military aircraft:

Aircraft	Total	Introduced	Last retired	Notes	References
Fairchild 82	2	1947	1954	First aircraft purchased	
Noorduyn Norseman	25	1947	1986	Highest number of planes in the fleet	
Stinson Reliant	1	1954	Unknown		
Beechcraft 18	4	1957	1990		
Cessna 180	5	c. 1963	After 1970		
Piper PA-18 Super Cub	1	c. 1963	After 1970		
Piper PA-23 Apache	1	c. 1963	Unknown		
Grumman G-21 Goose	3	c. 1963	c. 1984		
Curtiss Wright C-46	6	Unknown	Unknown		
Douglas DC-3	5	c. 1965	1991		
Consolidated PBY-5A Canso	1	1965	1992	Former RCAF aircraft; airworthy as of 2001	
De Havilland Canada DHC-3 Otter	2	1977	1986		
De Havilland Canada DHC-2 Beaver	1	1981	1985		

== Accidents and incidents ==
- On 23 December 1950, Norseman CF-CPS crashed at Kirkness Lake, Ontario, killing the pilot and passenger.
- On 22 October 1951, Norseman CF-BTH was destroyed after it struck rocks during a night landing at Red Lake Water Aerodrome.
- On 20 December 1957, Norseman CF-DRE crashed during a landing at Ball Lake, Ontario, seriously injuring the pilot and killing three passengers.
- On 25 July 1958, Norseman CF-IRH was involved in a mid-air collision with Norseman CF-BZM of Parsons Airways on approach to Kenora Airport. CF-BZM was written off, but CF-IRH was repaired and returned to service. All fifteen passengers and crew on both aircraft survived. The worst casualty was a broken arm.
- On 26 March 1960, Norseman CF-IRH crashed at Red Lake, Ontario and was destroyed.
- On 19 June 1974, Norseman CF-BHU crashed at Sachigo Lake, Ontario due to fuel mismanagement. The pilot was injured and one of the two passengers was killed.
- On 19 August 1965, Norseman CF-OBO was destroyed in a landing accident at Island Lake, Manitoba. The pilot was seriously injured.
- On 15 February 1983, Douglas DC-3 C-FBKX was damaged beyond repair in a crash landing near Shamattawa, Manitoba following an engine failure. The aircraft was on a non-scheduled passenger flight. All four people on board survived. As of July 2009, the wreckage remains on site at 55°58.18′N 92°31.65′W.

== See also ==
- List of defunct airlines of Canada
