= Minaki station =

Railway station in Ontario, Canada

Minaki
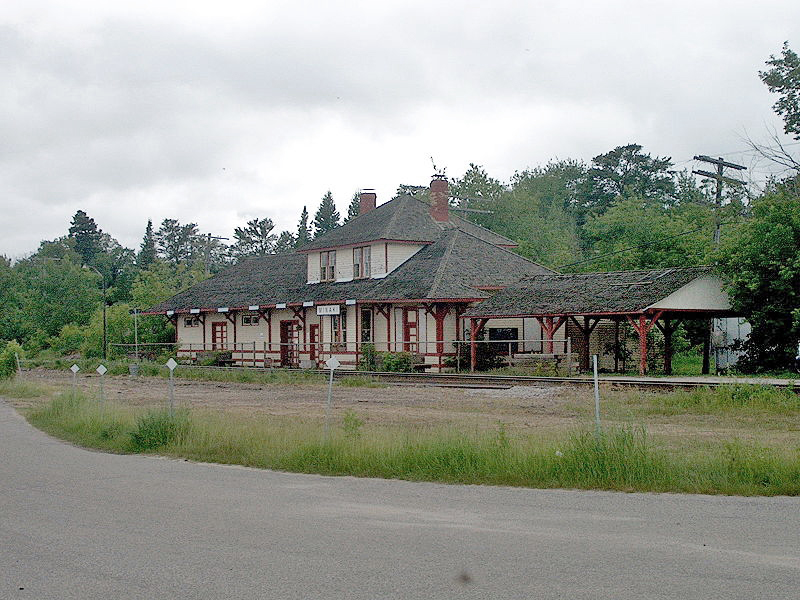

General information
- Location: Minaki, ON; Canada
- Coordinates: 49°59′08″N 94°40′08″W
- Owner: Via Rail

Construction
- Structure type: Sign post
- Parking: Yes

History
- Opened: 1910
- Former names: Canadian National Railway, National Transcontinental Railway

Services
| Preceding station | Via Rail | Following station |
|---|---|---|
| Ottermere toward Vancouver | The Canadian | Redditt toward Toronto |

Former services
| Preceding station | Canadian National Railway | Following station |
|---|---|---|
| Wade toward Vancouver | Main Line | Ena toward Montreal |

Heritage Railway Station (Canada)
- Designated: 2011
Location
- Location within Ontario

Minaki railway station is located in the community of Minaki in Unorganized Kenora District in northwestern Ontario, Canada. The station is on the Canadian National Railway transcontinental main line, and is in use by Via Rail as a stop for transcontinental Canadian trains.

The station was designated under the Heritage Railway Stations Protection Act in 2011. The designation notes it was built in 1910 by the National Transcontinental Railway.
