= Farlane station =

Railway station in Ontario, Canada

Farlane
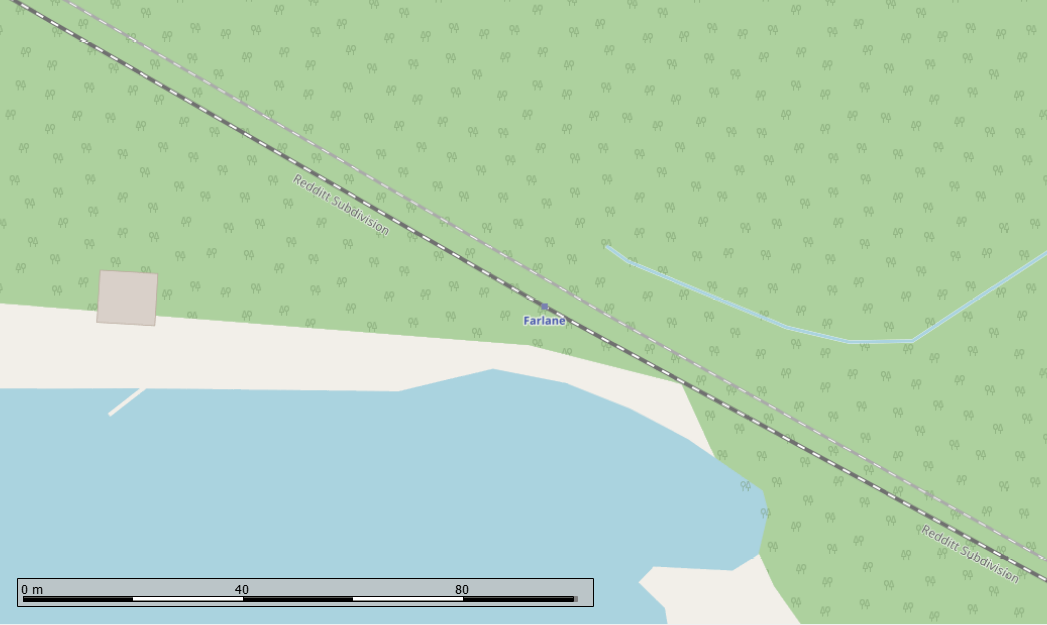
- Map showing the station stop, located at the north end of Cache Lake with a passing track to the north of the stop.

General information
- Location: Farlane, ON; Canada
- Coordinates: 50°00′25″N 94°12′01″W
- Owner: Via Rail

Construction
- Structure type: Sign post

Services
Preceding station	Via Rail	Following station
Redditt toward Vancouver	The Canadian	Canyon toward Toronto

Former services
Preceding station	Canadian National Railway	Following station
Brinka toward Vancouver	Main Line	Jones toward Montreal
Location
- Location within Ontario

Farlane railway station is located in the community of Farlane in Unorganized Kenora District in northwestern Ontario, Canada. The station is on the Canadian National Railway transcontinental main line and is in use by Via Rail as a stop for transcontinental Canadian trains.

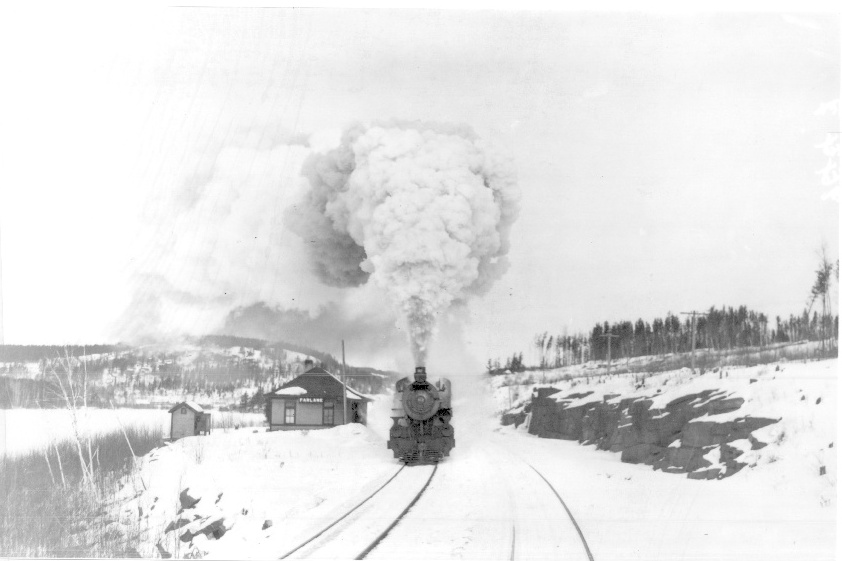
Train at the station in the 1930s.

The station was built in the 1920s, mainly to serve recreational cottage community around Farlane and nearby lakes which were only accessible by rail. Located at Mile 113.4 of the Redditt Subdivision of the Canadian National, it was built as a standard Design No. 3 of the National Transcontinental Railway, it was typical of stations intended for remote cottage communities, it contained a waiting room, baggage and an operator's telegraph bay. The station has been unstaffed for many years but received some maintenance from cottagers to serve as a shelter with a bench for train passengers.
