= Farlane, Ontario =

Farlane
- Location of Farlane in Ontario
- Coordinates: 50°00′32″N 94°12′15″W
- Country: Canada
- Province: Ontario
- Region: Northwestern Ontario
- District: Kenora
- Part: Kenora, Unorganized
- Elevation: 364 m (1,194 ft)
- Time zone: UTC-6 (Central Time Zone)
  - Summer (DST): UTC-5 (Central Time Zone)
- Postal code FSA: P0X
- Area code: 807

Farlane is an unincorporated place in Unorganized Kenora District in northwestern Ontario, Canada.

It lies on the Canadian National Railway transcontinental main line, between Brinka to the west and Jones to the east, and Farlane railway station is served by Via Rail transcontinental Canadian trains.

Located at Mile 113.4 of the Redditt Subdivision of the Canadian National, it was created just before World War I by the arrival of the National Transcontinental Railway, a predecessor of the Canadian National. A small station, typical of stations intended for remote cottage communities was built for passengers and a telegraph operator. In the 1920s as Farlane Lake and nearby lakes became popular for seasonal and weekend cottagers, many of whom were railway employees. A weekend train called the "Minaki Camper's Special" left Winnipeg every Friday and returned every Sunday in the 1920s allowing cottagers to reach cabins at Farlane and other nearby stations. VIA Rail still serves the community. The station building still stands but is unstaffed and worn but has received some maintenance from cottagers to serve as a shelter for train passengers.

In 1966, a 12 year old Ojibwe (Anishinaabe) boy named Chanie Wenjack died of hunger and exposure along the Canadian National tracks at Farlane attempting to walk 600 km home from Cecilia Jeffrey Indian Residential School in Kenora, a death which drew attention to the plight of children in residential schools.
