= Brinka, Ontario =

Brinka
- Location of Brinka in Ontario
- Coordinates: 50°00′13″N 94°18′25″W
- Country: Canada
- Province: Ontario
- Region: Northwestern Ontario
- District: Kenora
- Part: Kenora, Unorganized
- Elevation: 349 m (1,145 ft)
- Time zone: UTC-6 (Central Time Zone)
  - Summer (DST): UTC-5 (Central Time Zone)
- Postal code FSA: P0X
- Area code: 807

Brinka is an unincorporated place on Hall Lake on the MacFarlane River in Unorganized Kenora District in northwestern Ontario, Canada.

It lies on the Canadian National Railway transcontinental main line, between Redditt to the west and Farlane to the east, and is passed but not served by Via Rail transcontinental Canadian trains.
