= Minaki =

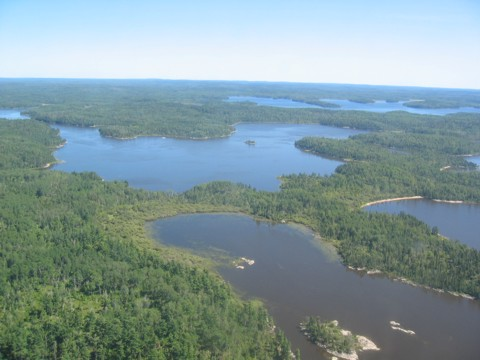
- A mosaic of lakes on the northern edge of Minaki

- Location of Minaki in Ontario
- Coordinates: 49°59′11″N 94°40′12″W
- Country: Canada
- Province: Ontario
- Region: Northwestern Ontario
- District: Kenora
- Part: Kenora, Unorganized
- Elevation: 321 m (1,053 ft)
- Time zone: UTC-6 (Central Time Zone)
  - Summer (DST): UTC-5 (Central Time Zone)
- Postal code FSA: P0X
- Area code: 807

Minaki (/məˈnæˌkiː/ mih-NAH-kee or /miːnɑːˈkiː/ mee-nah-KEE) is an unincorporated area and community in Unorganized Kenora District in northwestern Ontario, Canada. It is located at the point where the Canadian National Railways transcontinental main line crosses the Winnipeg River, between Wade to the west and Ena Lake at the east, and was accessible only by rail until about 1960. It was a fuelling and watering point in the days of steam locomotives; now few trains stop in Minaki, though the thrice-weekly Via Rail transcontinental Canadian passenger trains will stop on request at the Minaki railway station.

Tourism is the economic mainstay of Minaki, with camps, lodges and marinas catering to anglers and hunters. It is the embarkation point for more than 100 water-access cottages on surrounding lakes. The largest group of cottagers are from Winnipeg, about 3 hours drive away, and from nearby U.S. states.

== History ==
The westbound Canadian, Via Rail's transcontinental train, speeds through Minaki

First Nations people have lived on the Winnipeg River in the Minaki area for a millennium or more, judging by the potshards and arrow points that turn up along the shores. The river was a major canoe route for the explorers and fur traders in the early days of white settlement. In the nineteenth century the Hudson's Bay Company had a trading post a couple of kilometres north of the present community.

The modern community of Minaki got its start about 1910 when the National Transcontinental Railway built a bridge across the river near where Skipper Holst had built a hotel a few years earlier and called the place Winnipeg River Crossing. The booming city of Winnipeg was about three hours travel to the west on the railway, and in no time there was a land boom in vacation properties on the small lakes along the railway.

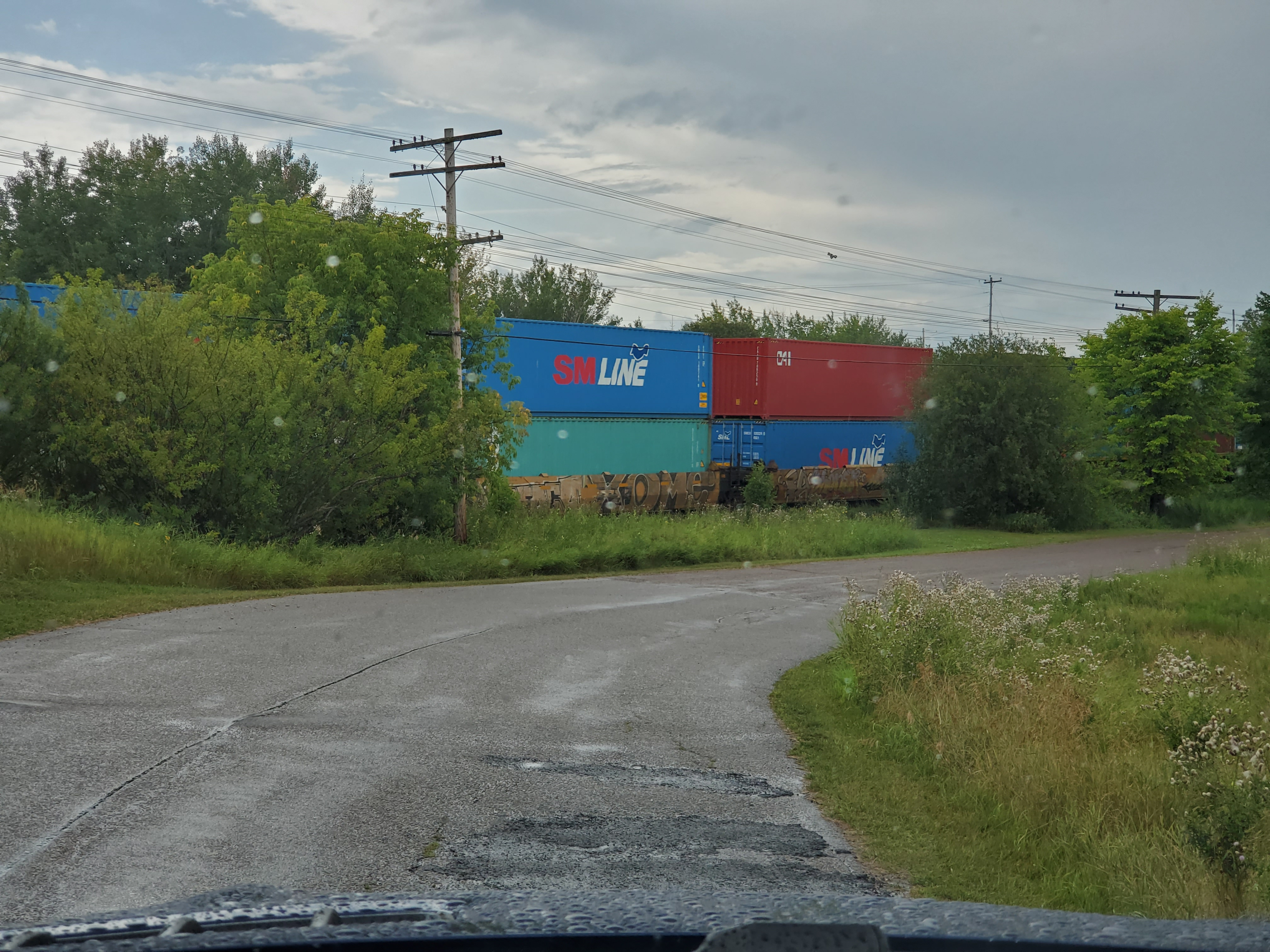
Train going through the town of Minaki

The Grand Trunk Pacific Railway, which operated the line for the National Transcontinental, built a rustic resort hotel that it called the Minaki Lodge and renamed the station Minaki, an Ojibwa word that has been variously translated as Beautiful Water or Good Land.

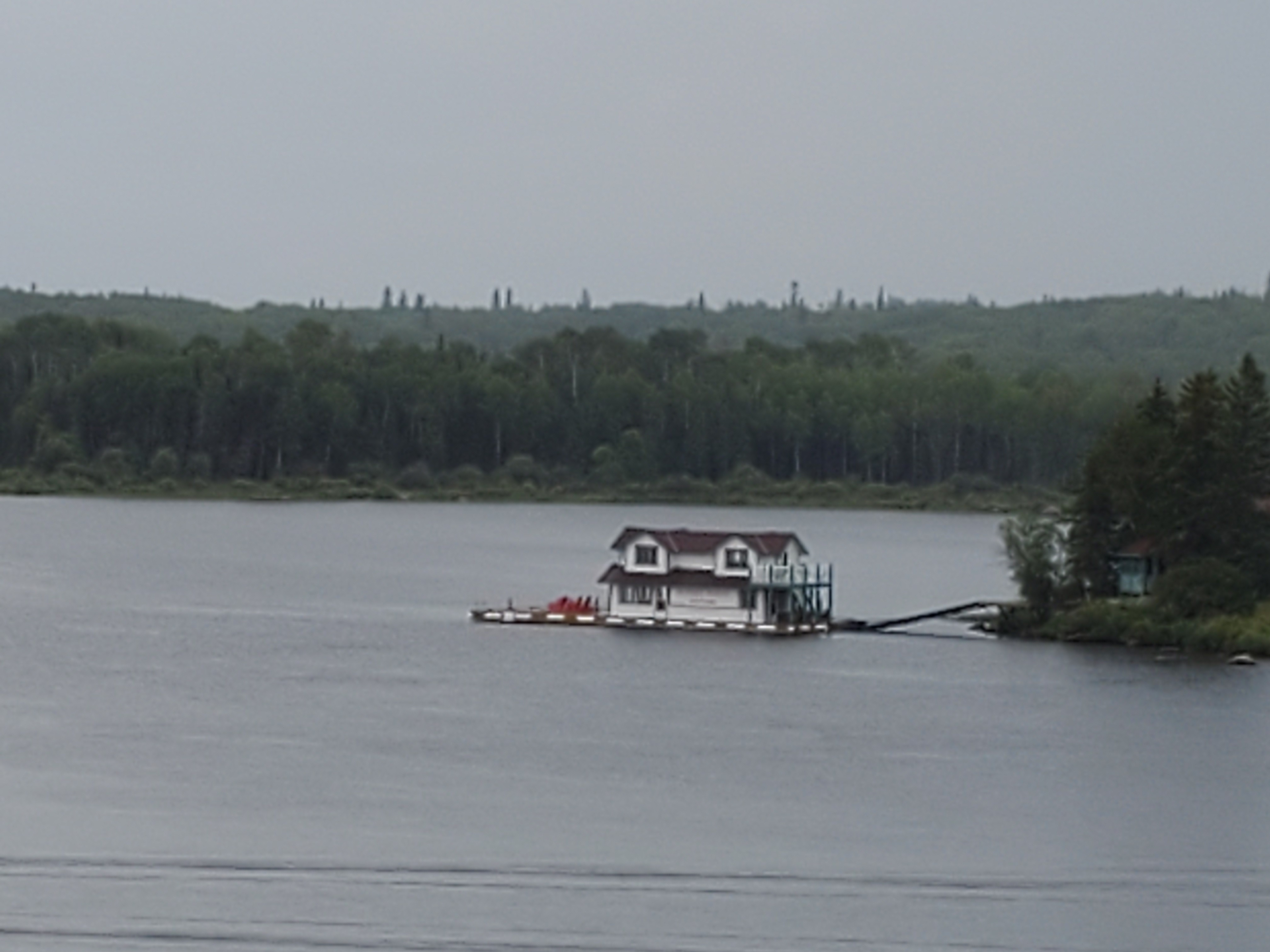
Sunset Point shop on the water in Minaki

== Demographics ==
In the 2021 Census of Population conducted by Statistics Canada, Minaki had a population of 197 living in 89 of its 344 total private dwellings, a change of 13.9% from its 2016 population of 173. With a land area of 150.23 km^{2} (58.00 sq mi), it had a population density of 1.3/km^{2} (3.4/sq mi) in 2021.

== Local government ==
Minaki has no local government as it is an unincorporated community located in an unorganized area, outside any incorporated townships. The Minaki Local Roads Board maintains the few roads in the community. The Minaki Local Services Board provides recreation through the Minaki Community Association and fire protection through the Minaki United Fire Fighters. The local services board owns and operates the Minaki Community Hall and the Minaki Fire Hall. There is also a volunteer first response team. The Minaki Foundation, a registered charity incorporated in 1986, raises money to support these and other local initiatives.

== Geography ==
Minaki is at the boundary where the white pine and yellow birch of the northwestern tip of the Great Lakes-St. Lawrence forest meet the jack pine, black spruce and trembling aspen of the boreal forest. Most major stands of white pine were either cut by the Simpson and Short lumber company in the 1920s or destroyed by wildfires in the drought summers of the 1930s. The largest remaining stands of virgin pine timber, the trees that symbolize the rugged north for many Canadians, are on islands where they were protected from both logging and fire. Some areas north of the town have been or are being logged to supply the Kenora Forest Products lumber mill (now closed) and a Weyerhaeuser oriented strand-board mill, both in Kenora.

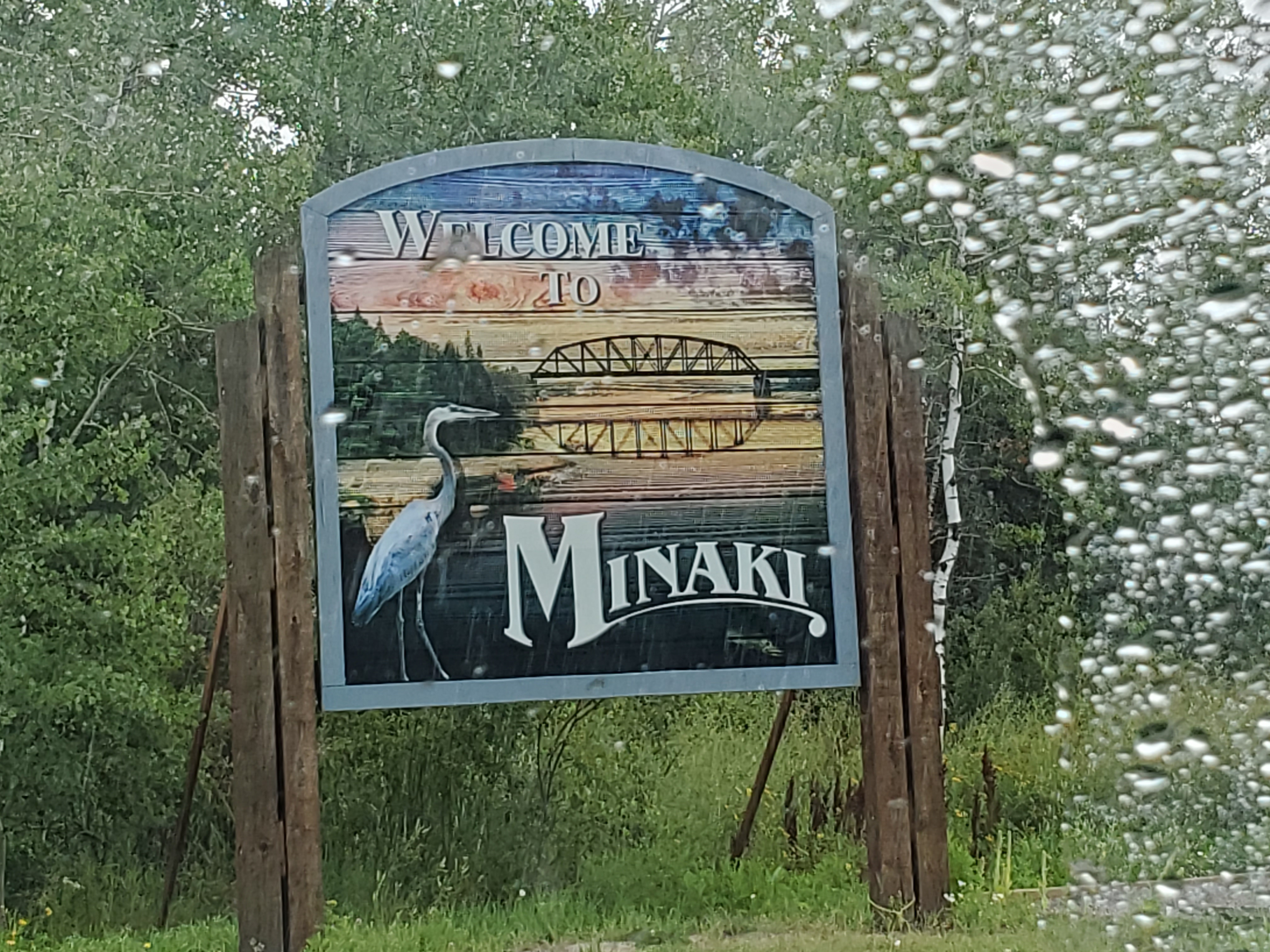
Sign at the entrance of the town of Minaki

Located about 45 minutes north of Kenora at the north end of paved Highway 596, the hamlet of Minaki is gateway to lakes and rivers of the Ontario portion of the Winnipeg River system, including Gun, Sand, Pistol and Roughrock lakes. Fly-in service is available to the English River and lakes farther north. Area lakes offer bass, muskie, northern pike and walleye. There are also many black bear, moose and deer in the rugged woods surrounding the town.

Many islands scatter the lakes. The main vacation season is July and August, with the August long weekend the peak of the summer season. Anglers also visit in the spring and hunters in the fall. Visitors to Minaki are few in the November–April period, though snow-machine traffic from Kenora to points farther north passes a few kilometres away from the community. Year-round population of the immediate Minaki area is estimated by residents at about 130. At the height of summer, the seasonal population of surrounding lakes served through Minaki is about 1,000.

The largest lake adjacent to Minaki is Sand Lake, which is north of the townsite. The part north of Harbour Island and Moore's Point is known as Big Sand Lake; the basin generally west of Harbour Island and Moore's Point is known as Little Sand Lake.
