= Fairchild 82 =

1935 utility aircraft family

Model 82 and 34-42 Niska
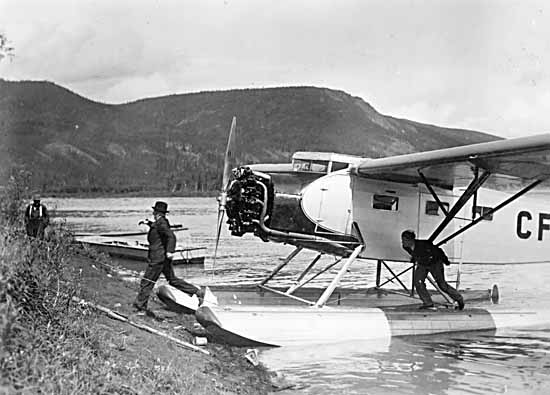
- Fairchild 82 float plane at Forty Mile, Yukon, July 1938

General information
- Type: Civil utility aircraft
- Manufacturer: Fairchild Aircraft Ltd. (Canada)
- Number built: 24

History
- First flight: 6 July 1935

The Fairchild 82 and the 34-42 Niska are a family of utility aircraft produced in Canada in the mid-1930s, based on designs by Fairchild Aircraft Ltd. (Canada)'s parent company in the United States.

== Design and development ==
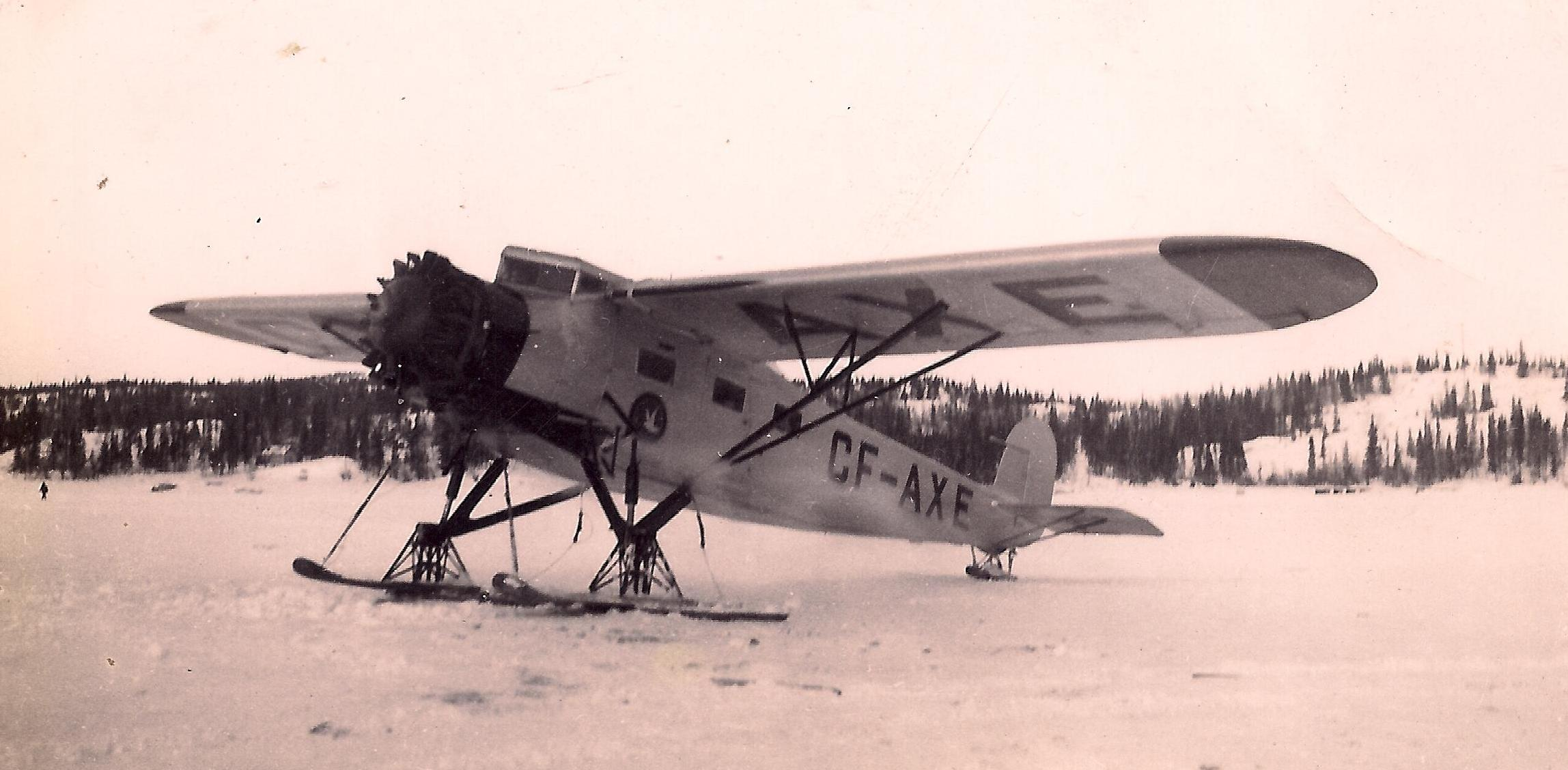
Canadian Airways Fairchild 82A CF-AXE on the goldfields in 1938. The skis have been set over some logs to prevent them from freezing to the surface

In 1929-1930, Fairchild (Canada) designed an eight-seat transport known as the Model 81. The single prototype was powered by either a 575 hp (429 kW) Pratt & Whitney Hornet or an Armstrong Siddeley Jaguar. The design was a "one-off" and did not enter production. In 1934, the parent company had also developed the Super 71 but only four were built. Undaunted, the company continued to refine the design and produced the Model 82 the following year. This retained the stretched forward fuselage and separate flight deck that had been a feature of the Super 71, but increased passenger and load capacity.

The resulting aircraft proved a modest success, with three sold to the government of Venezuela, one to the government of Mexico, and another seven going to various Canadian regional airlines. Variants with various powerplant changes followed, three of which went to Argentina.

The final development of this design was the 34-42 Niska, incorporating changes made after N.F. Vanderlipp joined the company from Bellanca (the new model reflecting Bellanca's idiosyncratic model numbering, and taking its name from an indigenous people of Canada). After unsuccessful trials with its 420 hp (310 kW) Ranger powerplant, the aircraft was converted back to a Model 82D standard with a S3H1 Wasp. Only a single example was built, and today it remains as the sole example surviving in Canada.

== Operational history ==
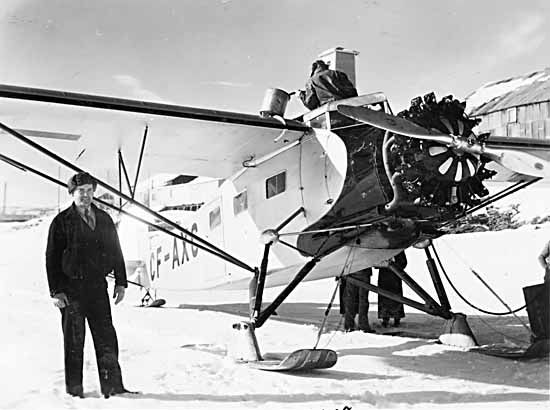
Fairchild 82 CF-AXC of British Yukon Navigation, on the ice at Mayo

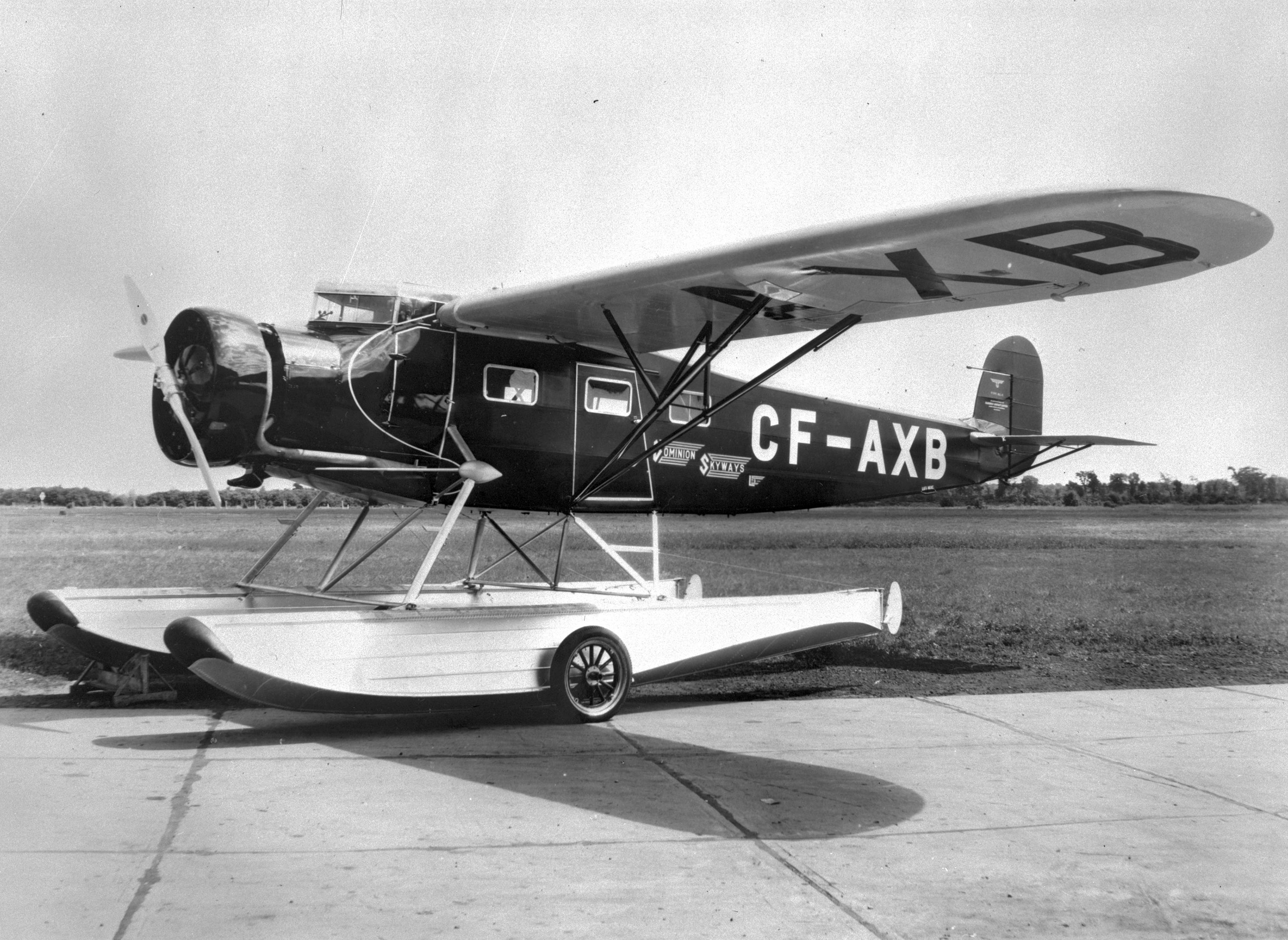
Dominion Skyways Fairchild 82

The Fairchild 82 was a rugged aircraft and it found a niche as a freighter especially in northern Canada, although export versions were used for a variety of roles including surveying and light transport. It was operated by numerous Canadian firms including Canadian Pacific Air Lines. While its main competitor, the Noorduyn Norseman was finding success with military orders, Fairchild decided to abandon the bush plane market temporarily in favour of producing the Bristol Bolingbroke bomber for the Royal Air Force and Royal Canadian Air Force immediately prior to the Second World War.

The company had intended to enter the postwar civilian market with an upgraded Model 82 but the original tooling had been destroyed during the war years. The remaining Fairchild 82s remained in service until the late 1960s.

A 40-year-old mystery of the Arctic was solved when the remains of a Fairchild 82 were found south of Bathurst Inlet. Chuck McAvoy was flying a pair of American geologists on 9 June 1964 when they disappeared. An extensive search ensued at the time but was unsuccessful, and it wasn't until in 2003 when the Royal Canadian Mounted Police (RCMP) finally found the crash site.

== Variants ==
- Model 82A - original production version (12 built)
- Model 82B - version with uprated engine (8 built)
- Model 82D - version with increased maximum takeoff weight (4 built)
- 34-42 Niska - refined version with new tailplane (1 modified from 82D, later modified back to 82D standard)

== Operators ==
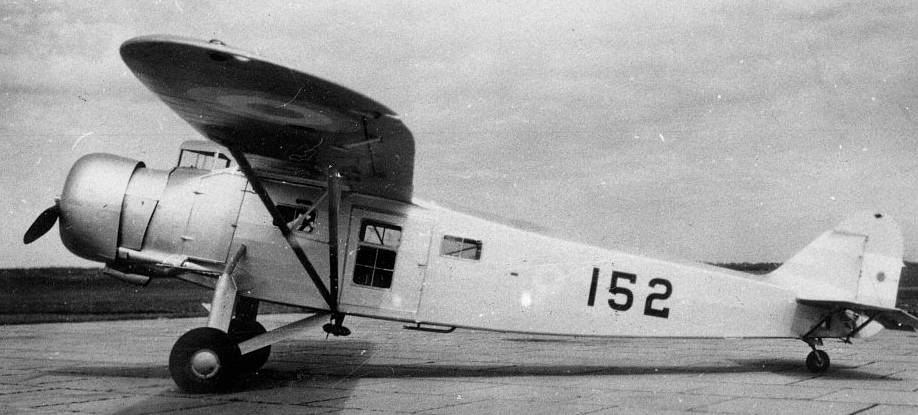
Fuerza Aérea Argentina Fairchild 82D

Argentina

- Fuerza Aérea Argentina Two Fairchild 82D purchased in 1937, initially assigned to survey duties with the Instituto Geográfico Militar. Both aircraft retired by 1963.
- Armada Argentina One Fairchild 82A purchased in 1938, used for aerial photo survey duties. Retired in 1947.

Venezuela

- Aviación Militar operated a single Fairchild 82B

== Surviving aircraft ==
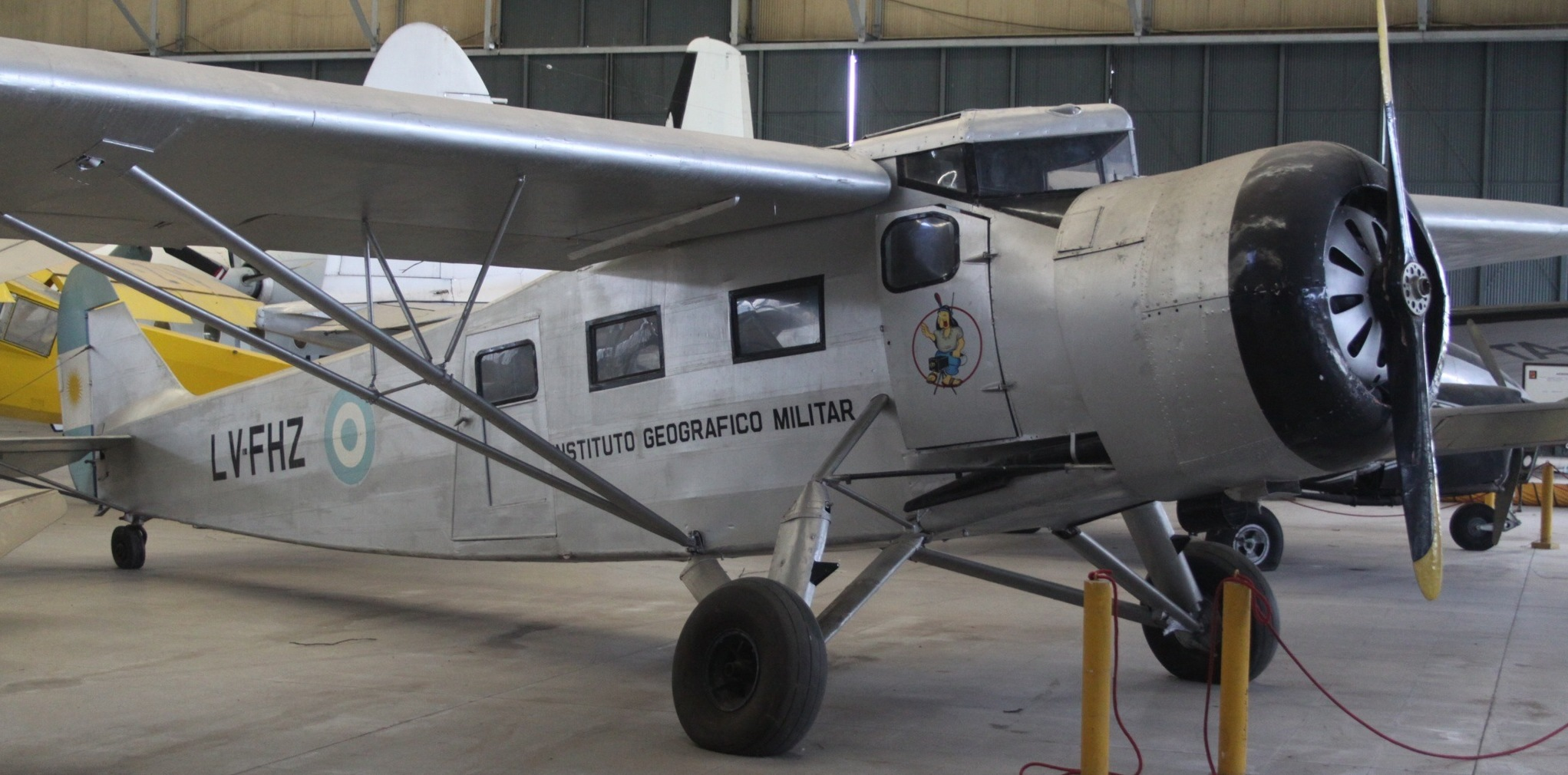
Fairchild 82D on display in Moron, Argentina

- Fairchild 82D LV-FHZ (T-152) msn 66, formerly of the Instituto Geográfico Militar is on display at the Museo Nacional de Aeronáutica in Moron, Argentina.
- Fairchild 82A, CF-AXL msn 61, formerly of Starratt Airways, Ontario Central Airlines, Canadian Pacific Airlines and others, is currently in the reserve hangar at the Canada Aviation and Space Museum in Ottawa, Ontario where it can be viewed on the guided tour.

== Specifications (Fairchild 82A) ==
General characteristics

- Crew: two pilots
- Capacity: nine passengers
- Length: 36 ft 11 in (11.25 m)
- Wingspan: 51 ft 0 in (15.54 m)
- Height: 9 ft 5 in (2.86 m)
- Wing area: 343 sq ft (31.9 m^{2})
- Empty weight: 3,060 lb (1,388 kg)
- Gross weight: 6,325 lb (2,869 kg)
- Powerplant: 1 × Pratt & Whitney Wasp 9 cylinder air-cooled radial engine , 525 hp (391 kW)

Performance

- Maximum speed: 155 mph (249 km/h, 135 kn)
- Range: 655 mi (1,054 km, 569 nmi)
- Service ceiling: 15,650 ft (4,770 m)
- Rate of climb: 900 ft/min (4.6 m/s)
