= Ottermere, Ontario =

Ottermere
- Location of Ottermere in Ontario
- Coordinates: 49°55′29″N 94°56′03″W
- Country: Canada
- Province: Ontario
- Region: Northwestern Ontario
- District: Kenora
- Part: Kenora, Unorganized
- Elevation: 352 m (1,155 ft)
- Time zone: UTC-6 (Central Time Zone)
  - Summer (DST): UTC-5 (Central Time Zone)
- Postal code FSA: P0Y
- Area code: 807

Ottermere is an unincorporated place and community in Unorganized Kenora District in northwestern Ontario, Canada.

Ottermere railway station is in the community. The station is on the Canadian National Railway transcontinental main line, between Malachi to the west and Wade to the east, and is served by Via Rail transcontinental Canadian trains.

Preceding station	Via Rail	Following station
Malachi toward Vancouver	The Canadian	Minaki toward Toronto
Former services
Preceding station	Canadian National Railway	Following station
Malachi toward Vancouver	Main Line	Wade toward Montreal
