= Cecilia Jeffrey Indian Residential School =

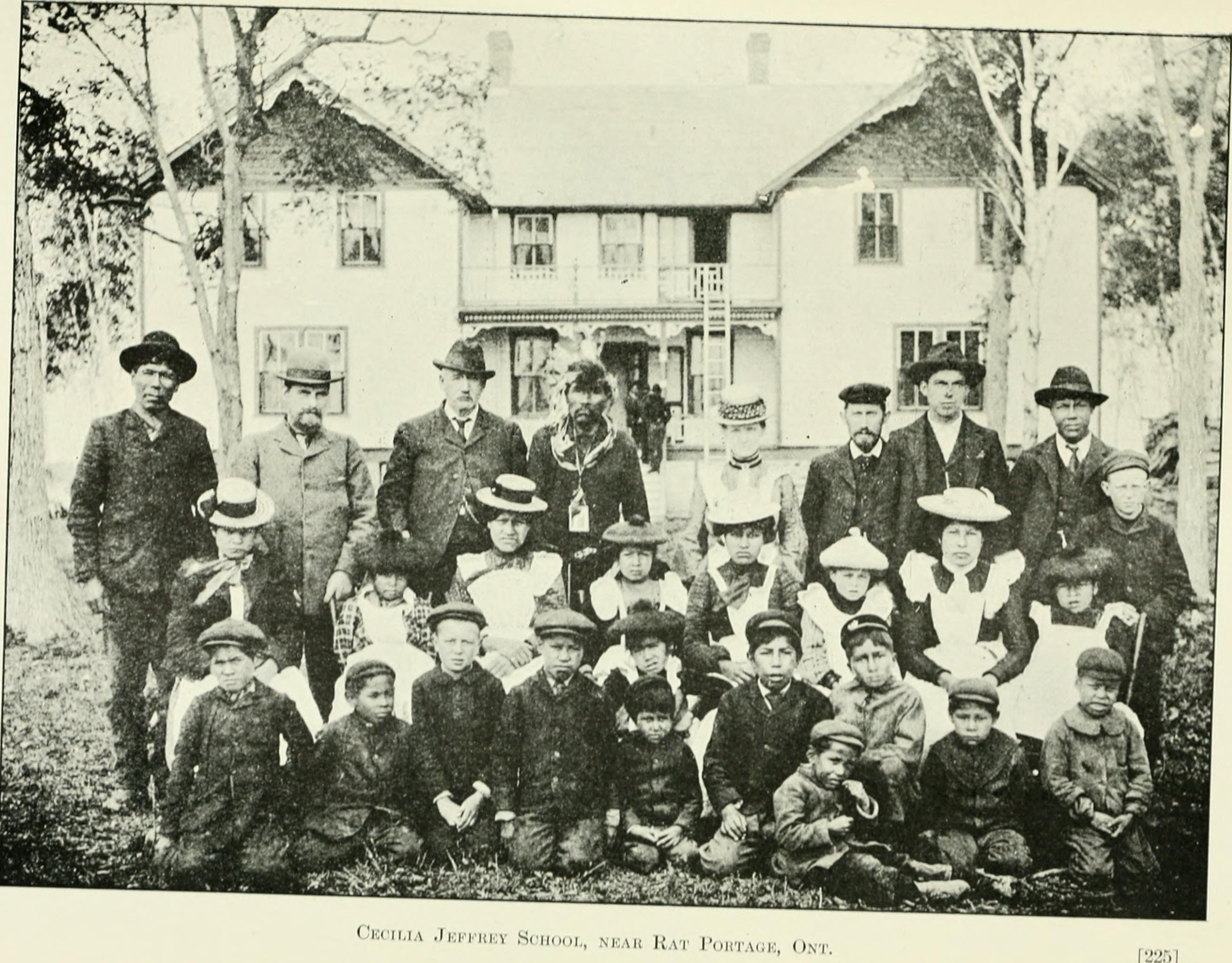

Information
- Other names: Kenora Residential School Shoal Lake School Cecilia Jeffrey Boarding School Cecilia Jeffrey Presbyterian Indian Residential School
- Established: 1902
- Closed: 1976

Cecilia Jeffrey Indian Residential School was a residential school that operated from 1902 until 1976 near Shoal Lake, Ontario. The school was funded by the government of Canada and operated by the Presbyterian Church of Canada. Between 1925 and 1927, the school was operated by the United Church of Canada. In 1969, the government of Canada took over operations at the school.

Students who attended Cecilia Jeffrey Indian Residential School came from Shoal Lake 40, Northwest Angle 33, Marten Falls, Whitefish Bay, Lac des Mille Lacs, Islington 29, Fort Alexander, Rat Portage 38A, Deer Lake, Lac Seul, Osnaburgh 63A, Pic Mobert, Assabaska, Fort Hope 64, Fisher River, Long Plain, and Seine River First Nations.

== History ==
The Cecilia Jeffrey Indian Residential School was built in 1901 and opened in 1902 at the request of the Shoal Lake First Nation who entered into an agreement with the Presbyterian Church to establish the school. The school was named after Cecilia Jeffrey, the first Secretary of Indian Work at the Kenora Woman's Foreign Missionary Society. Despite several clauses in the initial former agreement that limited proselytization and the amount of labour children would be required to perform, as well as stipulating that students would, one at a time, be allowed to leave to participate in traditional ceremony, abuse was rampant.

Many former attendees at the school have reported physical and sexual abuse, as well as medical experimentation suffered by students. Medical experiments conducted on students included experimental treatment for ear infections, as well as nutritional experiments.

=== Death of Chanie Wenjack ===
It was common for many children to attempt to flee Indian Residential Schools. There are several recorded instances of students who die while escaping. Chanie Wenjack is one such example of a student who died while attempting to escape the Cecilia Jeffrey School. Wenjack was an Anishinaabe student from Marten Falls First Nation. On October 16, 1966 Wenjack, accompanied by two friends, escaped from Cecilia Jeffrey School. His body was found over 60 kilometers away from the school by a Canadian National Railway engineer along the train tracks. Wenjack died of hunger and exposure.
