= Chanie Wenjack =

Ojibwe First Nations boy

- Born: January 19, 1954; Marten Falls First Nation, Ontario, Canada
- Died: October 23, 1966 (aged 12); Farlane, Ontario, Canada
- Cause of death: Hunger and exposure
- Other name: Charlie
- Known for: Escaping from Cecilia Jeffrey Indian Residential School

Chanie "Charlie" Wenjack (January 19, 1954 – October 23, 1966) was an Ojibwe (Anishinaabe) First Nations boy who in 1966 escaped from the Cecilia Jeffrey Indian Residential School in Kenora, Ontario, Canada where he had boarded for three years. He died of hunger and exposure at Farlane, Ontario, while trying to walk 600 km (370 mi) back to his home, Ogoki Post on the Marten Falls Reserve.

His ordeal and his death brought attention to the mistreatment of children by the Canadian Indian residential school system: following Wenjack's death, an inquest into the matter was ordered by the Government of Canada.

== Early life, education, and escape ==
Chanie Wenjack was born on January 19, 1954, at Ogoki Post on the Marten Falls Reserve. In 1963, aged nine, Wenjack and three of his sisters were forcibly removed from their home and sent to the Cecilia Jeffrey Indian Residential School in Kenora. The school, which housed approximately 150 students at the time, was funded by the Canadian government and overseen by the Women's Missionary Society of the Presbyterian Church. According to Maclean's, there were only six supervisors for the entire student body, leading to frequent attempts by children to escape. Wenjack spent the first two years of his schooling in grade one and was placed in remedial classes soon after. The principal of the school a year prior to his escape recalled him having a good sense of humour and a talent for understanding wordplay.

On October 16, 1966, Wenjack escaped the Cecilia Jeffrey School alongside his friends, orphaned brothers Ralph and Jackie MacDonald. They were among twelve children who escaped that day, though the other nine were caught within 24 hours. The trio reached Redditt, 31 km (19 mi) north of Kenora, where they stayed with Ralph and Jackie's uncle and aunt, Charles and Clara Kelly. After four days, Wenjack left the Kellys, intending to follow the Canadian National Railway (CN) mainline towards Ogoki Post, about 600 km (370 mi) east, using a CN passenger timetable with a map as his guide. The Kellys gave him food and matches and advised him to seek help from the section maintenance crews stationed along the line.

== Death ==
Wenjack had only a light windbreaker and walked for 36 hours in the wind as the temperature dropped to −6 °C (21 °F). Evidence given at the inquest into his death showed that he had made his way another 20 km (12 mi) east along the CN mainline. Bruises on his body implied that he fell numerous times. He collapsed and died sometime on the morning of October 23 in a rock cut near Farlane.

Wenjack's body was found next to the track at 11:20 am that same day by Elwood McIvor, a CN engineer on freight train number No. 821. McIvor contacted the Ontario Provincial Police (OPP) who recovered the body an hour later with help from a CN section crew. Coroner Glenn Davidson attributed Wenjack's death to exposure and hunger.

Wenjack was buried at the cemetery on the reserve beside the Albany River on October 27. After the funeral, Wenjack's grieving father chose to keep his daughters home from the residential school, a decision respected by the principal.

== Inquest and aftermath ==
On November 17, an inquest was begun and a report was commissioned and determined that:

The Indian education system causes tremendous emotional & adjustment problems for these children.

— Coroner's jury

Ethical questions were raised and it brought to light the abuse and treatment of Indigenous children in the residential school system. A year after Wenjack's death, an article written by journalist Ian Adams, "The Lonely Death of Charlie Wenjack," was published in February 1967 in Maclean's magazine. The article brought the ordeal to national attention.

The Wenjack affair along with many other incidents would bring legislative reforms and class action lawsuits as well as the Indian Residential Schools Settlement Agreement and the Truth and Reconciliation Commission.

== Impact ==
The story of Wenjack has been seen as a symbol of resistance against the residential school system. In 1973, Indigenous students at Trent University lobbied for a building to be named after Wenjack. The largest lecture hall on campus was subsequently named Wenjack Theatre in Wenjack's honour. On March 9, 2018, Trent University marked the official launch of the Chanie Wenjack School for Indigenous Studies.

In 2016, the Gord Downie-Chanie Wenjack Fund was established to help with reconciliation between Canada and Indigenous peoples.

In 2025, Wenjack was named a Person of National Historic Significance.

== In popular culture ==
On June 21, 2016, a Heritage Minute about Wenjack's death was released by Historica Canada to coincide with National Aboriginal Day, now renamed as National Indigenous Peoples Day. Unlike other Heritage Minutes that were narrated by actors, Wenjack's was narrated by his sister, Pearl.

The Tragically Hip singer Gord Downie wrote a solo concept album based on Wenjack's escape. The album, Secret Path, was released on October 18, 2016, along with a concurrent graphic novel of Wenjack's story by novelist Jeff Lemire and an animated film which aired on CBC Television.

Published in October 2016, a novella by Canadian author Joseph Boyden focused on the suffering Wenjack endured and his state of mind during his ordeal. Its title is simply Wenjack. The novella was released alongside Snip, an animated short film by Terril Calder.

"Charlie", a song recorded in 1971 by singer-songwriter Willie Dunn about Wenjack, was not well known at the time, but received renewed attention in the early 2020s following the release of both Secret Path and the Dunn compilation album Creation Never Sleeps, Creation Never Dies.
