= Wade, Ontario =

Wade
- Location of Wade in Ontario
- Coordinates: 49°56′35″N 94°47′25″W
- Country: Canada
- Province: Ontario
- Region: Northwestern Ontario
- District: Kenora
- Part: Kenora, Unorganized
- Elevation: 366 m (1,201 ft)
- Time zone: UTC-6 (Central Time Zone)
  - Summer (DST): UTC-5 (Central Time Zone)
- Postal code FSA: P0Y
- Area code: 807

Wade is an unincorporated place and railway point in Unorganized Kenora District in northwestern Ontario, Canada.

It lies on the Canadian National Railway transcontinental main line, between Ottermere to the west and Minaki to the east, has a passing track, and is passed but not served by Via Rail transcontinental Canadian trains.

Many cottagers use Wade as a destination to get to their cottages on the adjacent Fox Lake. Cottagers have an organized association that ensures good relations and insurance for crossing the rail line.
