= MacFarlane River (Ontario) =

- Location of the mouth of the MacFarlane River in Ontario

Location
- Country: Canada
- Province: Ontario
- Region: Northwestern Ontario
- District: Kenora
- Part: Kenora, Unorganized

Physical characteristics
- Source: Rocky Lake
  - coordinates: 50°00′50″N 94°16′16″W
  - elevation: 345 m (1,132 ft)
- Mouth: Winnipeg River
  - coordinates: 49°56′08″N 94°33′23″W
  - elevation: 315 m (1,033 ft)

Basin features
- River system: Hudson Bay drainage basin

The MacFarlane River is a river in Unorganized Kenora District in northwestern Ontario, Canada and a tributary of the Winnipeg River. Locally it has been called the "Black River", a reference to the dark tannin stained water.

== Course ==
The MacFarlane River begins at Rocky Lake and heads southwest reaching Bluff Lake and the unincorporated place of Brinka. It continues southwest to Grindstone Lake, where it takes in the left tributary Boot Creek, then to Basket Lake and the community of Redditt. The river continues southwest to Corn Lake, where it takes in the left tributary Talbot Creek, passes out, takes in the left tributary Whitney Creek and reaches Ena Lake, where it takes in the right tributary Octopus Creek. It continues southwest over a control dam, and reaches its mouth at the Winnipeg River. For almost the entire course, the river is paralleled by the Canadian National Railway transcontinental main line,

== Tributaries ==
- Octopus Creek (right)
- Whitney Creek (left)
- Talbot Creek (left)
- Boot Creek (left)

== Lakes ==
- Ena Lake
- Corn Lake
- Basket Lake
- Grindstone Lake
- Bluff Lake
- Hall Lake
- Rocky Lake

== Communities ==
- Ena Lake
- Redditt
- Brinka

== See also ==
- List of rivers of Ontario

== Sources ==
- "MacFarlane River". Geographical Names Data Base. Natural Resources Canada.
