= Wenjack (novella) =

Book by Joseph Boyden

- First edition
- Author: Joseph Boyden
- Illustrator: Kent Monkman
- Language: English
- Genre: Historical fiction
- Publisher: Hamish Hamilton
- Publication date: 2016
- Publication place: Canada
- Pages: 112
- ISBN: 978-0735233386

Wenjack is a historical fiction novella by Canadian author Joseph Boyden based on the story of Chanie "Charlie" Wenjack.

Published by Hamish Hamilton (Penguin Books) in 2016 and featuring illustrations by Cree artist Kent Monkman, it was part of a collaborative effort to commemorate the 50th anniversary of Chanie's death. The book follows Chanie Wenjack, a 12-year-old Ojibwe boy, as he escapes from a Northern Ontario residential school in the futile hopes of returning home to his family and two dogs. It alternates between Chanie's perspective and the perspectives of Manitous, who take on different animal forms to keep a silent watch on Chanie as he walks on foot to a home he does not know is hundreds of kilometers away.

== Plot ==
The story begins with Chanie describing his experiences of abuse from residential school teachers, who he and his friends (two brothers) call "Fish Bellies" or "Sucker Bellies" for their pale skin. On an October afternoon, Chanie and the two brothers decide to run away. Because of a lung infection, Chanie struggles to keep up with his friends. Eventually the three boys reach a river, where they run into the two brothers' uncle. They are given a meager meal of freshly-caught fish in the cabin where the uncle, his wife, and his daughter are staying. That night, Chanie sleeps on the floor by the wood stove.

In the morning, the uncle tells his wife to send Chanie away, while he takes his two nephews to the trapline to look for food. When Chanie gets up to join them, the uncle tells him that it would be dangerous to have four people in his canoe. The mother sends Chanie on his way with dried moose meat and tells him to turn right at the tracks to head back to the school. The girl gives him a glass jar that holds seven matches. Chanie leaves the cabin, resolved to find his two friends and their uncle. However, when he reunites with them, the uncle tells him he cannot stay and that he must return to the school. He tells Chanie he can beat the impending bad weather if he travels quickly.

At the railroad tracks, Chanie turns in the direction away from the school and toward where he thinks his home will be. When it is dark, he decides to sleep next to a beaver pond, lighting a small fire with the matches given to him by the girl. However, the fire gives him little to no protection against the extremely cold temperatures that night. He ends up dreaming about the sexual abuse he experienced at the hands of one of his teachers. Back on the tracks, Chanie continues to slowly make his way on his journey, weakened from exhaustion and exposure. He falls a number of times before finally succumbing to the cold. After his death, a mother lynx lifts Chanie's spirit and carries him into the forest, away from the tracks. In the morning an engineer comes across Chanie's frozen body by the tracks and notifies the authorities. The story ends with Chanie, warm and happy, dancing in the forest with all of the animals featured throughout the novel.

== Background ==
Wenjack was released for the 50th anniversary of Chanie "Charlie" Wenjack's death as part of a collaborative effort to, as Joseph Boyden put it, "put Charlie out into the world."

Prior to the release of the book, Boyden wrote a Heritage Minute narrated by Chanie's sister, Pearl Achneepineskum. Boyden obtained Pearl's permission over the phone to go ahead with the novella. She also shared the only existing photo of Chanie, which appears at the end of Boyden's book. He also collaborated with Métis filmmaker Terril Calder to produce Snip, an animated short based on Wenjack's story.

This collaborative gesture was initiated by Canadian rock musician Gord Downie's brother, Mike Downie, who foregrounded an article by Ian Adams published in Maclean's in 1967 titled "The Lonely Death of Chanie Wenjack", documenting Chanie's escape from a residential school at the age of 12 and the subsequent discovery of his body by a set of train tracks. Boyden also acknowledged the influence of the ballad "Chanie Wenjack" by the Canadian singer-songwriter Willie Dunn.

The book's release coincided with the release of Gord Downie's concept album Secret Path, the centrepiece of Downie's multimedia art project based on Wenjack's story, which also included a graphic novel of the same name by Canadian cartoonist Jeff Lemire and an animated film produced by CBC Arts. Boyden also contributed two spoken-word tracks to A Tribe Called Red's 2016 album, We Are the Halluci Nation.

On October 22, 2016, imagineNATIVE hosted "A Night for Chanie", a special multimedia presentation of film, music, and performance related with a reading of the book by Boyden and introductory remarks by Senator Murray Sinclair of the Truth and Reconciliation Commission. The event was dedicated to honouring the memory of Wenjack and all other children of residential schools.

In an interview about the book, Boyden reflected that he "want[ed] us as Canadians to understand the fuller history of our country, to take it upon him or herself to learn beyond what you weren't taught in school. And the importance of that. It's not so we feel guilty or bad for what people we never met did, it's beyond that. It's how do we come together as a nation and move forward together."

== Reception ==
Wenjack had moderately positive reception from the mainstream media. John Bemrose of Maclean's described the book as "spellbinding," and "a novella that deftly suffuses Chanie's tragedy with traditional Aboriginal beliefs." Denise Balkissoon of The Globe and Mail described it as "slim but heart-wrenching." In conjunction with the release of Boyden's book and Gord Downie's Secret Path, a call for stories was put out by Maclean's for other runaways from residential schools.

The Brock Press, a student newspaper of Brock University in Ontario, wrote that the novella "is short, but vast in its significance," claiming that it "continues to make strides in its telling of Wenjack's story, pushing for the history of residential schools, the attempts to destroy First Nations cultures and forced assimilation through violence and hate to be more widely viewed and discussed as a part of Canada's history."

Reception to Wenjack was later overshadowed by the controversies around Boyden's genealogy and tribal affiliations. Debbie Reese, an Indigenous author and researcher of Native-American portrayal in children's literature, had an overall negative perception of Boyden's novella. In a series of tweets a few months after the release of Wenjack, she criticizes Boyden's act as just one of many that "[make] Native ancestry … the centerpiece of who they are," and the belief that "they can speak/write of things they ought not." Pieta Woolley, in an article for the United Church Observer titled "Cultural thieves", mentioned Wenjack as an introduction to labelling Boyden as "the latest alleged offender" in the midst of social questions regarding cultural thievery.
