= Macfarlane River (New Zealand) =

River in New Zealand

Coordinates: 43°58′S 169°27′E

Location
- Country: New Zealand

Physical characteristics
- Mouth
  - location: Landsborough River
- Length: 16 km (9.9 mi)

The Macfarlane River is a river of the southwest of New Zealand's South Island. It flows south from the Southern Alps, joining with the Landsborough River just before the latter's outflow into the Haast River.

== See also ==
- List of rivers of New Zealand
