= Theodore Fontaine =

Canadian community leader and author (1941–2021)

Theodore Niizhotay Fontaine
- Born: September 7, 1941
- Died: May 10, 2021 (aged 79)
- Citizenship: Sagkeeng Ojibway First Nation; Canada
- Education: Northern Alberta Institute of Technology (BS)
- Occupations: Community leader, author, Public Speaker
- Organization: Assembly of Manitoba Chiefs
- Known for: First Nations advocacy, Residential School survivor
- Notable work: Broken Circle: The Dark Legacy of Indian Residential Schools (2010)
- Title: Chief of Sagkeeng Ojibway First Nation
- Term: 1979–1981
- Spouse: Morgan Fontaine

Theodore Niizhotay Fontaine (September 7, 1941 – May 10, 2021) was a Canadian community leader, author, public speaker, and residential school survivor. He was widely recognized as a prominent figure in First Nations advocacy and public service, known for his expertise in First Nations rights, languages, culture, spirituality, and traditions.

Fontaine was born on September 7, 1941, and resided in Winnipeg, Manitoba. He belonged to the Sagkeeng Ojibway First Nation and served as its chief from 1979 to 1981. His journey as a survivor of the residential school system began at the Fort Alexander Indian Residential School in 1948, where he remained until 1958. He then attended the Assiniboia Indian Residential School from 1958 to 1960. The traumatic experiences he endured during this period left him deeply troubled and led him towards a destructive path. However, he eventually found solace and healing.

Fontaine obtained a degree in Civil Engineering from the Northern Alberta Institute of Technology in 1973. In 2010, he published his memoir, Broken Circle: The Dark Legacy of Indian Residential Schools, through Heritage House. The book, which documented the psychological and sexual abuse he suffered at residential schools in Manitoba from 1948 to 1960, became a national bestseller. It recounted his personal journey of healing and recovery over several decades.

Following the publication of Broken Circle, Fontaine dedicated the next ten years of his life to public speaking engagements, where he discussed topics related to residential schools, his memoir, and other indigenous issues. Broken Circle has been widely used as an educational resource across Canada and in the United States, included in curricula from Grades 4–5 through post-secondary education.

Fontaine held various positions throughout his career, including twelve years as the executive director and negotiator of national employment equity claims for the Assembly of Manitoba Chiefs. He also worked for organizations such as the Forks Development Corporation, The Banff Centre for Management, Peace Hills Trust, the Indigenous Leadership Development Institute, the Manitoba Museum, the Victorian Order of Nurses, and Palliative Manitoba, where he volunteered as an end-of-life caregiver.

In his later years, Fontaine adopted the name of his great-grandfather, Niizhotay. He was invited to numerous Canadian citizenship ceremonies and welcomed new citizens and families, earning great honor and respect. Additionally, he shared his residential school experiences through speaking engagements at the Canadian Museum of Human Rights and the United States Holocaust Memorial Museum. Fontaine's courage to speak out about his experiences inspired many others, as noted by Marie Wilson, a former commissioner of the Truth and Reconciliation Commission of Canada.

In 2022, a second edition of Broken Circle was released by Heritage House in collaboration with Fontaine's widow, Morgan Fontaine. This commemorative edition featured a new foreword by Andrew Woolford, a professor of sociology and criminology at the University of Manitoba and an expert in genocide studies. It also included an introduction by Charlene Diehl, director of the Winnipeg International Writers Festival, an updated and expanded photo section, a detailed biography of Fontaine by Morgan Fontaine, and a new afterword discussing the legacy of Canada's Indian residential schools, excerpted from Fontaine's foreword in Stolen Lives, a classroom guide for educators published by Facing History and Ourselves in 2015.

As a testament to his impact and legacy, the City of Winnipeg officially renamed Wellington Park to Theodore Niizhotay Fontaine Park in November 2022. A special unveiling ceremony for the renamed park took place on November 16, which was attended by Fontaine's wife, Morgan.

Under Morgan's guidance, the Theodore Niizhotay Fontaine Legacy Initiative carries on supporting important work. A logo is available for use where the TNF Legacy Initiative is involved.
