= Ena Lake, Ontario =

Ena Lake
- Location of Ena Lake in Ontario
- Coordinates: 49°58′17″N 94°31′29″W
- Country: Canada
- Province: Ontario
- Region: Northwestern Ontario
- District: Kenora
- Part: Kenora, Unorganized
- Elevation: 335 m (1,099 ft)
- Time zone: UTC-6 (Central Time Zone)
  - Summer (DST): UTC-5 (Central Time Zone)
- Postal code FSA: P0X
- Area code: 807

Ena Lake
- Location within Ontario
- Location: Kenora District, Ontario, Canada
- Coordinates: 49°58′56″N 94°30′57″W
- Primary inflows: Octopus Creek, MacFarlane River
- Primary outflows: MacFarlane River
- Basin countries: Canada
- Average depth: 10 ft (3.0 m)
- Max. depth: 75 ft (23 m)
- Surface elevation: 1,125 ft (343 m)

Ena Lake is the name of a lake and an adjacent unincorporated area and railway point in Unorganized Kenora District in northwestern Ontario, Canada, about 23 kilometres (14 mi) north of the city of Kenora. Formerly a stop on the Canadian National Railway, it is now a small cottage community of approximately 50 seasonal residents and 11 year round residents.

== Geography ==
Ena Lake is a typical Canadian Shield lake: the shore is rocky with many high ridges and hills, and the water is clear and cool. The major inflows are Octopus Creek (locally called "Ena Brook") from Octopus Lake and the MacFarlane River (locally called "Corn Creek") from Corn Lake. The major outflow is the MacFarlane River, controlled by a small dam, below which one finds a rapids and falls. The MacFarlane River flows to the Winnipeg River. Thus, the lake is in the Nelson River and Hudson Bay drainage basins.

== Transportation ==
Ena Lake can be accessed from Kenora via Ontario Highway 658, then Ena Lake road. It is on the Canadian National Railway transcontinental main line, between Minaki to the west and Redditt to the east, has a passing track, and is passed but not served by Via Rail transcontinental Canadian trains. It may also be reached by boat via the Winnipeg River and MacFarlane River, from which a short portage leads to the lake. The historical and public portage route is tightly along the north side of the rapids/falls, starting right next to the dam at the out flow of Ena Lake, it crosses the road, where a sign marks the portage route. Boat trips to Redditt via the MacFarlane River and Corn Lake are also possible.

== Natural history ==
In the spring great flocks of white pelicans fish for spawning fish in the rapids below the falls at the outflow from the lake. Flocks of up to 200 have been observed. The tributary Ena Brook (called Octopus Creek on topographical maps) and Corn Creek (called McFarlane River on topographical maps) have a boreal floating bog/wetland.

Fish species included smallmouth bass, walleye, and northern pike. Whitetail deer, moose, and black bear may be seen along the shore. Beaver and active lodges are present, especially along Ena Brook and Corn Creek.

== Recreation ==
Ena Lake is a popular starting point for canoe trips to Vermillion Lake, Octopus Lake, and beyond.

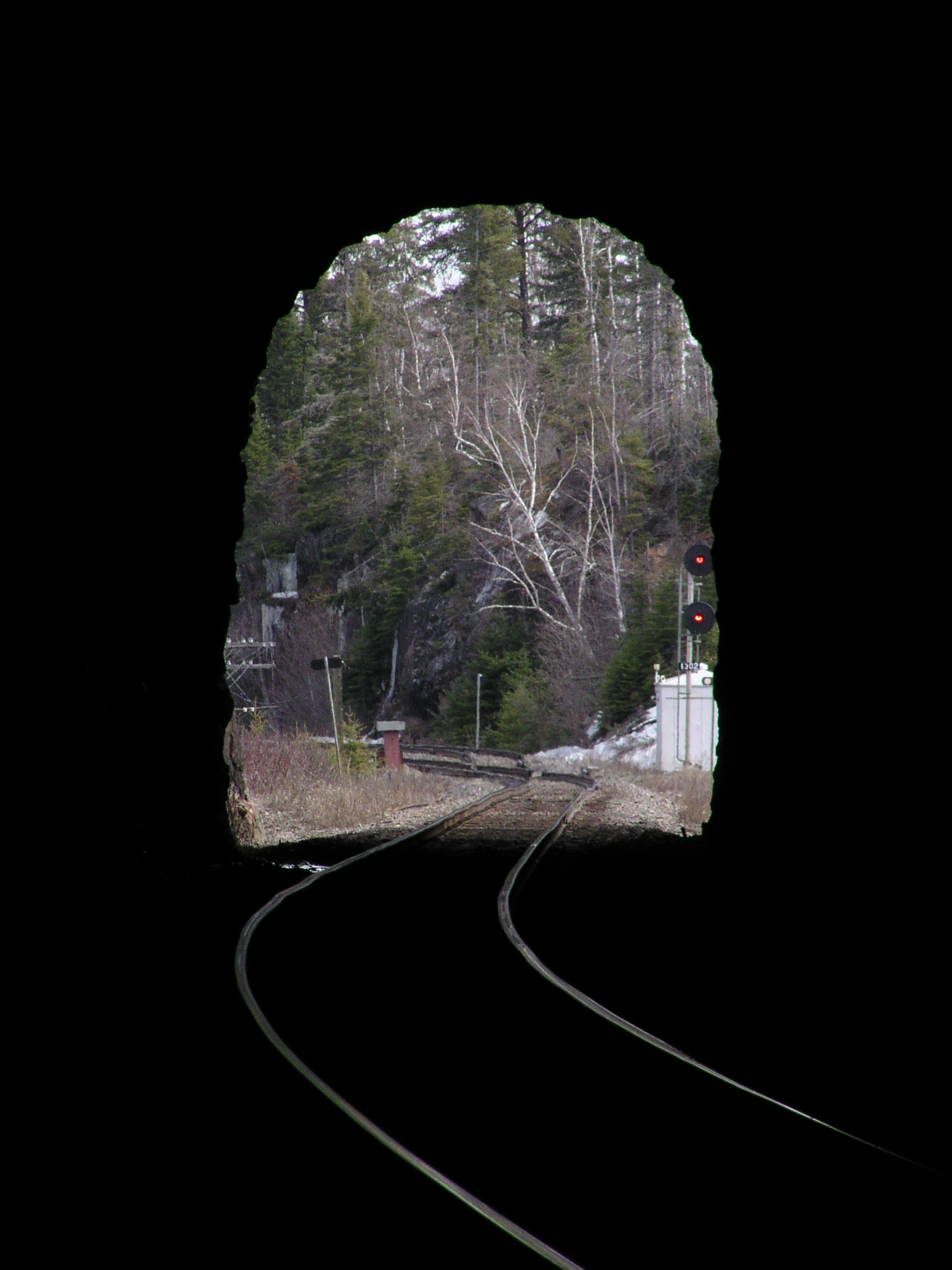
View from inside CNR tunnel, looking east

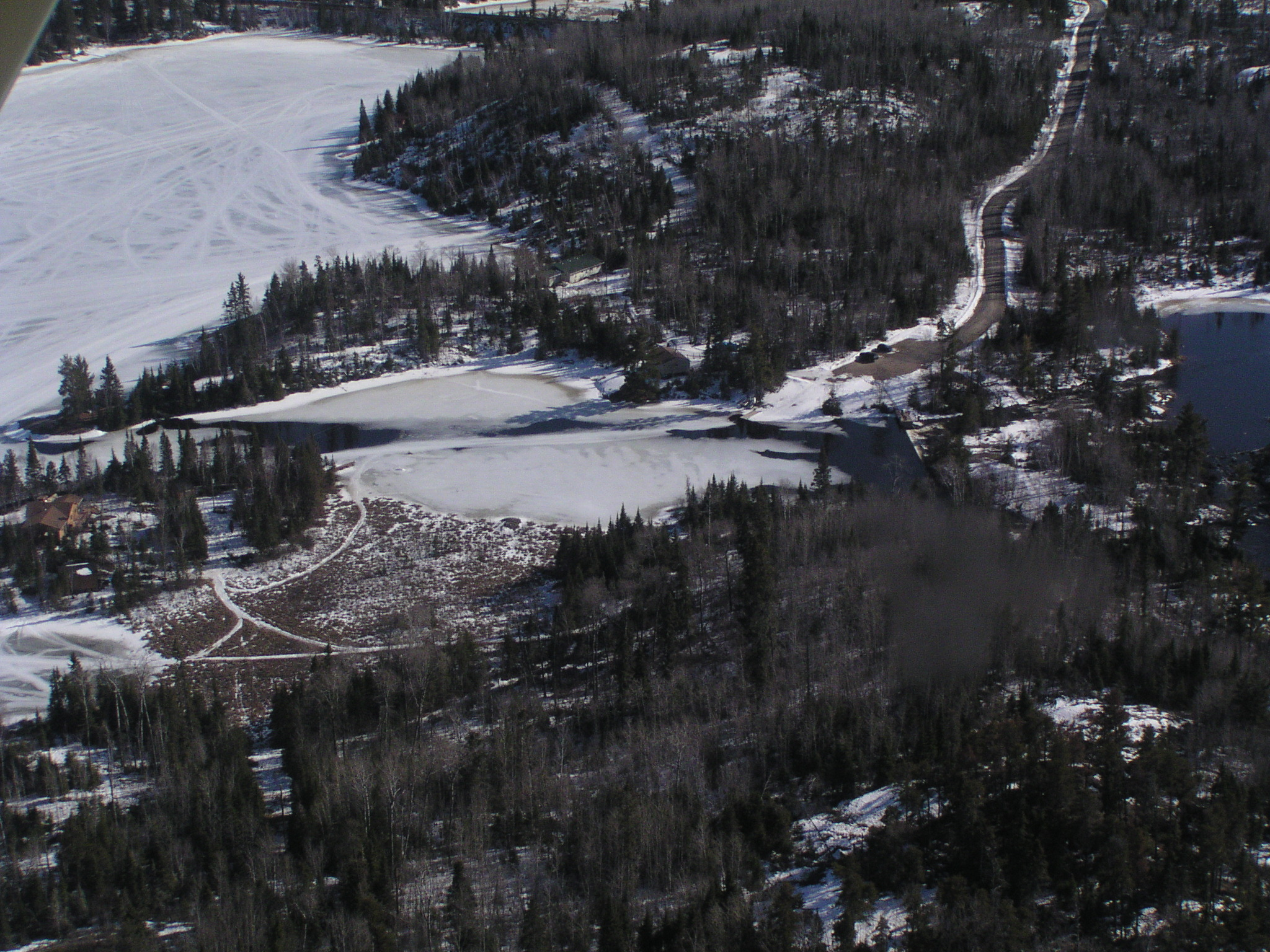
Dam and landing at Ena Lake

== See also ==
- List of lakes in Ontario
