= Snip (film) =

2016 Canadian film

- Film poster
- Directed by: Terril Calder
- Written by: Joseph Boyden
- Produced by: Jason Ryle
- Cinematography: Terril Calder
- Edited by: Terril Calder
- Animation by: Terril Calder
- Production company: Terril Calder Films
- Release date: September 2016 (TIFF)
- Running time: 15 minutes
- Country: Canada
- Language: English

Snip is a Canadian animated short film, directed by Terril Calder and released in 2016. Released as a tie-in to Joseph Boyden's novella Wenjack, the film centres on two contemporary indigenous children, Annie and Gordon, who travel back in time in an effort to save two other children, Charlie and Niska, from the Indian residential school system.

The film premiered at the 2016 Toronto International Film Festival, and was named to TIFF's annual year-end Canada's Top Ten list for 2016. It was subsequently screened at the 67th Berlin International Film Festival in 2017, where it received an honorable mention from the short film jury in the Generation 14Plus program of youth films.
