= Edward Gamblin =

Canadian singer

Edward Gamblin (1948–2010) was a Canadian country rock singer and songwriter, who was one of the most influential early stars of First Nations music.

Born in 1948 at Cross Lake, Manitoba, Gamblin was a member of the Cree people. At the age of five, he was sent to the residential school at Norway House, where he remained until transferring to the residential high school at Portage la Prairie in his teens. He left high school at 16 and hitchhiked to Winnipeg, where he stayed briefly before returning to Norway House, where he formed his first band, Cree Nation, in 1966. He married his childhood classmate Aurelia Monias in 1970, and the couple lived in both Winnipeg and Norway House at different times.

Gamblin performed with a variety of bands over the course of his career, most notably Northern Lobo, and wrote more than 60 original songs.

In his later years, Gamblin became an activist for healing and reconciliation around the abuses of the residential school system, writing "Survivor's Voice" and working with the Aboriginal Healing Foundation. He also attracted press attention for reuniting with Florence Kaefer, a teacher at the Norway House school who hadn't known the full extent of the abuses going on in the student residence.

In 2008, Gamblin had an accident on stage, cutting his ankle. The wound became infected, and resulted in the amputation of his leg. His health continued to decline, and he died on July 27, 2010, in Winnipeg.

== Discography ==
- Edward Gamblin
- Wild Child
- Don't Blame It on the Rain
- Soldier Blue
- This Can't Go On (1975)
- Greatest Hits (2002)
- Bright Blue Moon (2003)
- Cree Road (2006)
