= Redditt =

- Designated place
- Location of Redditt in Ontario
- Coordinates: 49°58′51″N 94°23′30″W
- Country: Canada
- Province: Ontario
- District: Kenora
- Part: Kenora, Unorganized

Government
  - Type: Local services board
  - MP: Eric Melillo (CPC)
  - MPP: Greg Rickford (PC)

Area
  - Land: 70.01 km^{2} (27.03 sq mi)
- Elevation: 335 m (1,099 ft)

Population (2021)
  - Total: 139
  - Density: 2/km^{2} (5.2/sq mi)
- Time zone: UTC−6 (Central)
  - Summer (DST): UTC−5 (Central)
- Postal code FSA: P0X 1M0
- Area code: Area code 807

Redditt is an unincorporated community in Unorganized Kenora District in northwestern Ontario, Canada. It is on the MacFarlane River, and located at the northern terminus of Ontario Highway 658, 27 kilometres (17 mi) north of Kenora. Redditt is also the name of the surrounding geographic township that includes the community.

A designated place served by a local services board, Redditt had a population of 139 in the 2021 Canadian census.

== Demographics ==
In the 2021 Census of Population conducted by Statistics Canada, Redditt had a population of 139 living in 76 of its 170 total private dwellings, an increase of 19.8% from its 2016 population of 116. With a land area of 70.01 km^{2} (27.03 sq mi), it had a population density of 2.0/km^{2} (5.1/sq mi) in 2021.

== Transportation ==
Until 1985, the main street of Redditt was called Highway 666. In 1985, an Evangelical Christian church located on the road nearer to Kenora asked for the highway to be renumbered, as there was a highway sign directly outside the church and they "got a lot of comments" from it being the number of the mark of the beast. Subsequently, the main street of Redditt and the road into town were renumbered to Highway 658. Members of the church had argued to the Ministry of Transportation of Ontario that it was inappropriate for their church to be located on the "Highway to Hell." Redditt is also the starting point for what is locally known as the "English River Road," which provides access the exploitation of resources, mostly logging, in the region north of Redditt.

Once a location for a Canadian National Railway roundhouse, the rail-yard operations were closed down in the early 1950s when the CNR switched to diesel-electrics from steam. Ontario Central Airlines, owned by Barney Lamb, then established a maintenance facility in the old roundhouse for its fleet of amphibious charter aircraft. The old switch yard was used as a landing strip for wheel aircraft after the tracks had been pulled. The inflow to Corn Lake (the MacFarlane River) was then dredged, and a control dam was constructed at the out flow of Ena Lake to ensure an adequate water depth for the landing of amphibious aircraft, which were then towed by dolly to the former roundhouse for maintenance.

Redditt is on the Canadian National Railway transcontinental main line, between Ena Lake to the west and Brinka to the east, and Redditt railway station is served by Via Rail transcontinental Canadian passenger trains.

There is no scheduled bus service to Redditt.

== Economy ==
The primary economic activities are tourism and resource harvesting. Several hunting and sport fishing lodges and camps are found in Redditt. The facilities are usually quite basic, relying on the "external" or outdoor experience. Many outfitters, lodges, and camps (the terms are often used interchangeably) provide varying levels of service from simple "house keeping" cabins to full "American plan" (generally understood to mean all-inclusive except for licenses, alcohol, and tobacco). Some of the operators provide an "outpost" camp experience; these outlying camps or cabins can usually only be reached by air via float plane. The areas where these "outposts" are located are more isolated, and less frequented by travellers, and thus often offer a higher potential for trophy hunting and fishing, and consequently offer the non-hunter or non-angler a chance to experience the northern wilderness uninterrupted without being imposed upon by strangers.

The greater proportion of the working population is employed in Kenora. There are many summer and weekend cottages/camps located in and around Redditt; the majority of which are owned by people from Winnipeg and Kenora, with few American people that have purchased properties in and around the town. The relative remoteness and isolation, low density, and privacy are attractive to people seeking a "rustic" retreat or recreational experience. The cost of recreational properties around Redditt is still very affordable for average incomes, especially when compared to prices on Lake of the Woods or the Winnipeg River. ATV Trails and ski trails are abundant around Redditt. At the west side of Redditt, just north of Corn Lake, there is a rock quarry where high-quality granite is mined.

A branch of the Royal Canadian Legion is located in Redditt. There is also a fire hall and a community club which hosts curling in winter and also various other community functions.

== Recreation ==
Fishing and hunting are the primary recreational and tourism activities for Redditt, and the Northwestern Ontario region in general. Though ecotourism is also being promoted, it has failed to fully develop. Locals (including the First Nations, or Aboriginal Peoples) historically engaged in hunting and fishing for food. As such, whitetail deer, moose, ducks and geese were and are the primary quarry for local hunting. Ruffed and spruce grouse are popular upland game birds. Snowshoe hare is a tradition catch for women and children. Walleye (pickerel), northern pike, whitefish and lake trout were the primary food fish species. Outfitting and sport hunting is still focused on whitetail and moose. Black bears and wolves are becoming more and more desirable for non-resident hunters, especially those from Europe and the USA. Many local residents find employment as hunting and/or fishing guides. The primary sport fish species are walleye, northern pike, smallmouth bass, lake trout and muskie.

Snowmobiling is a popular winter activity in Redditt. Snowmobile trails connect Redditt with Kenora. Day trips to Redditt from Kenora are very popular. It is also possible to travel by snowmobile from Redditt to Manitoba, and to Woodland Caribou Provincial Park. The trails to Manitoba are fairly well maintained, and appropriate for operators of average ability. The trails to Woodland Caribou Provincial Park are single track, rugged, and extremely challenging, with many unpredictable water crossings and are therefore only appropriate for very experienced operators. Hiring an experienced guide is strongly recommended, as is traveling in groups. It is always recommended to be prepared for self rescue when snowmobiling, winter weather conditions can prevent search and rescue from reaching those seeking aid for many days.

Norway Lake, at the north end of town, is a popular picnic location (overnight camping is no longer allowed). A fine beach and warm water makes it an attractive outing destination in the summer. Armstrong Lake, at the east end of town, is also popular for recreation and fishing. Corn Lake, at the south/west side of the village, is also a popular fishing and swimming destination for residents and visitors.

=== Bottle House ===
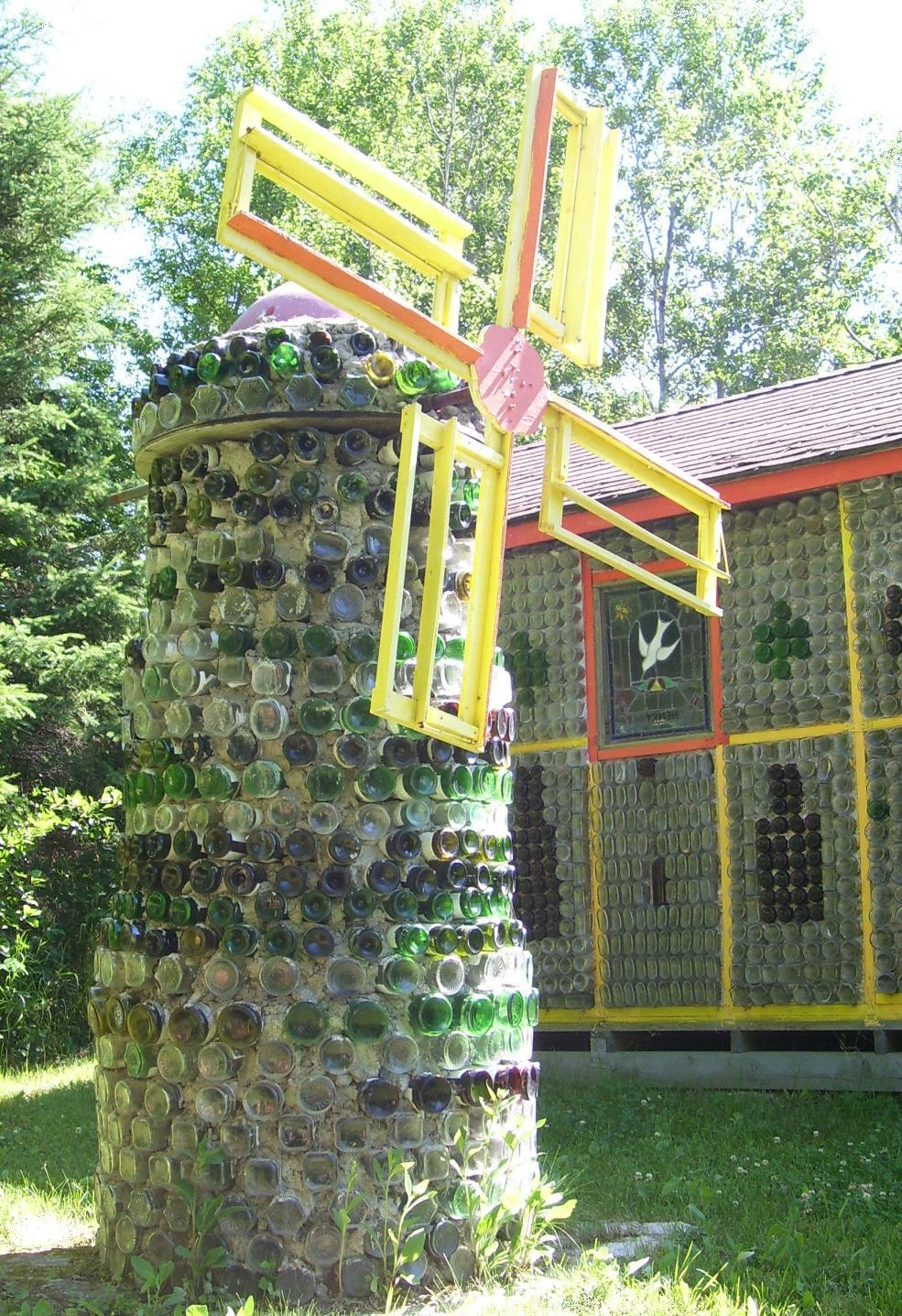
The windmill at the Redditt bottle house

Redditt is home to the Bottle House, a set of fantasy-themed structures designed and built by Hank and Myrtle Deverell in the 1970s. According to the owners, the attraction took approximately 25,000 bottles and 1,000 pounds of mortar to build and the Deverells spent approximately 1,750 hours building it.
