= Risk factors for genocide =

Signs of active or impending genocide

The assessment of risk factors for genocide is an upstream mechanism for genocide prevention. The goal is to apply an assessment of risk factors to improve the predictive capability of the international community before the killing begins, and prevent it. There may be many warning signs that a country may be leaning in the direction of a future genocide. If signs are presented, the international community takes notes of them and watches over the countries that have a higher risk. Many different scholars, and international groups, have come up with different factors that they think should be considered while examining whether a nation is at risk or not. One predominant scholar in the field James Waller came up with his own four categories of risk factors: governance, conflict history, economic conditions, and social fragmentation.

== James Waller's risk factors ==
=== Governance ===
The regime type of the government is an indicator on whether the nation is in danger of genocide or not. An anocracy and a transitional government are the types that have the most danger while a full monarchy is the most stable. The nation also has a higher risk if there is state legitimacy deficit, which would include high corruption, disregard for constitutional norms, or mass protests. If a state structure is weak and provides poor basic services for the citizens, restricted the rule of law, or has a lack of civilian protection, it also creates a higher risk and could become unstable. If there is identity-based polar factionalism or systematic state-led discrimination through exclusionary ideology, or political contentious along identity line this can create a divide of people in the nation creating different ranks and violence amongst the civilians.

=== Conflict history ===
A state is more likely to experience genocide or mass atrocity if it has a history of identity-related tensions, otherwise known as a tendency to other, or if it has committed prior genocides/politicides, this is because a government may already have the previous weapons, strategies, and power since the last genocide. It is also aware of how much damage it can do once more if it has evaded repercussions for human rights violations in the past. Also, if a state has had a record of serious violations of international human rights laws, the population of the country is more desensitised to the violence and it may also be less aware of what is happening around it. Other conflict histories that put a state at risk are past cultural traumas that have hurt the core social identity of the state, or if the people have been known to have a legacy of group grievances or vengeance. The more conflict a country has had in the past can make its population more unstable and more at risk for genocide.

=== Economic conditions ===
States with low levels of economic development are more likely to have problems because it creates a low opportunity cost for mass violence, as the citizens' lives aren't valued as much as in an economy that has high levels. States that practice economic discrimination, make it so one group of people have the most economic opportunity, forcing the other group to be unemployed or if they have horizontal economic inequalities, which is when a country's economy is based on a small number of opportunities, and products. Those conditions with the addition of high unemployment rates, foreign debt, and informal economies such as growing black markets a country is at risk of its economic conditions playing into their risk factors for Genocide.

=== Social fragmentation ===
Social fragmentation can be broken into five major subcategories; identity-based social divisions, demographic pressures, unequal access to basic goods and services, gender inequalities, and political instability. Identity-based social divisions, constitute of differential access to power, wealth, status, and resources, meaning that certain people have more access to what the need to live than others, or when a state practices hate speech, like RTLMC in Rwanda. Demographic pressures can be experienced in a state has a high population density, massive movements of refugees or internal displaced peoples, or a male youth bulge, which means that there is a high male population with nothing really to do. Unequal access to basic goods and services, which can be shown by high infant mortality rates, as mothers and children would not be getting the proper care that they needed to grow and be healthy. Gender inequalities are shown in rate of violence against women, as these are normally an indicator of how the country views their women, and if it is a low rate they normally see them more as equals. Political instability can be revealed by hurtful regime changes, threats of armed conflict, proportions of populations that are armed, and where the country is in the world, and if its neighboring countries have conflict it has been known to spill into the neighboring regions.

If a nation has one or more of these risk factors it does not mean that they will have a genocide but they are simply additive factors that when put together can be used to help predict and defuse a tense, or dangerous, situation.

== UN risk assessment "Framework of Analysis for Atrocity Crimes" ==
In 2014, led by Special Advisers Adama Dieng and Jennifer Welsh, the United Nations released the Framework of Analysis for Atrocity Crimes, a document that identifies 14 main risk factors for genocide and other atrocity crimes. The framework has been used by human rights advocates to highlight genocide risk for vulnerable populations, including the Armenians of Nagorno-Karabakh, Ethiopians, and Palestinians.

These risk factors include:

Common risk factors:

1. Situation of armed conflict or other forms of instability
2. Record of serious violations of international human rights and humanitarian law
3. Weakness of State structures
4. Motives or incentives
5. Capacity to commit atrocity crimes
6. Absence of mitigating factors
7. Enabling circumstances or preparatory action
8. Triggering factors

Risk factors specific to each international crime:

For genocide:

1. Intergroup tensions or patterns of discrimination against protected groups
2. Signs of an intent to destroy in whole or in part a protected group

For crimes against humanity:

1. Signs of a widespread or systematic attack against any civilian population
2. Signs of a plan or policy to attack any civilian population

For war crimes:

1. Serious threats to those protected under IHL
2. Serious threats to humanitarian or peacekeeping operations

== Fund for Peace’s Analysis: "Conflict Assessment System Tool" ==
The Fund for Peace non-profit organization, has written a conflict assessment framework manual to help "meet security challenges stemming from weak and failing states." The Conflict Assessment System Tool (CAST) has 12 pressure indicators including:

1. Demographic pressures
2. Refugees and internally displaced people
3. Group grievance
4. Human flight and brain drain
5. Uneven economic development
6. Economic decline
7. State Legitimacy
8. Public Services
9. Human rights and rule of law
10. Security Apparatus
11. Factionalized Elites
12. External intervention

Along with each pressure indicator is a list of scores indicating when that indicator is becoming a serious risk factor. A score of 0 means there is no risk at all score of 10 would be a serious problem. Also included in the CAST is a guide to assessing the capacities of the state. The capacities are leadership, military, police, judiciary and civil service.

== European Commission: checklist for root causes of conflict ==
The European Commission has come up with their own risk factors to assess the risk of a country committing mass atrocities and genocide. The eight risk factors they chose are:

1. Legitimacy deficit
2. Restrictions to the rule of law
3. Violations on fundamental rights
4. Weak civil society and media
5. Tensions between communities/ Absence of dispute-resolution mechanisms
6. Poor economic management
7. Socio-economic regional inequalities
8. Geopolitical instability

Each risk factor has other multiple subsections that can point to more specific events that can be seen as potential risk factors for conflict. Along with the subsections, there are examples of what possible objectives could be in order to improve that specific risk factor.

== Gregory Stanton: "Ten Stages of Genocide" ==
Genocide Watch, The Alliance Against Genocide published Gregory Stanton's list of ten stages of genocide, which include:

1. Classification
2. Symbolization
3. Discrimination
4. Dehumanization
5. Organization
6. Polarization
7. Preparation
8. Persecution
9. Extermination
10. Denial

These stages can be seen in every genocide that scholars have studied so far. They can be used as red flags for future genocides. The Ten Stages of Genocide model has been used by the US State Department, UN, many genocide scholars and policy makers, and teachers and museums worldwide.

=== Development of the model ===
In 1996 Gregory Stanton, the founding president of Genocide Watch, presented a briefing paper called The 8 Stages of Genocide at the United States Department of State. In it he suggested that genocide develops in eight stages that are "predictable but not inexorable". (Note: The FBI has found somewhat similar stages for hate groups.) In 2012, Stanton added two additional stages, Discrimination and Persecution, to his model, which resulted in a ten-stage model of genocide.

The stages are not linear, and usually several occur simultaneously. Stanton's model is a logical model for analyzing the processes of genocide, and for determining preventive measures that might be taken to combat or stop each process.

The Stanton paper was presented at the State Department in 1996, shortly after the Rwanda genocide, but it also analyzes the processes in the Holocaust, Khmer Rouge Cambodia, and other genocides. The preventive measures suggested are those that the United States, national governments, and U.N. could implement or influence other governments to implement.

Stage	Characteristics	Preventive measures
1. Classification	People are divided into "them and us".	"The main preventive measure at this early stage is to develop universalistic institutions that transcend... divisions."
2. Symbolization	"When combined with hatred, symbols may be forced upon unwilling members of pariah groups..."	"To combat symbolization, hate symbols can be legally forbidden as can hate speech".
3. Discrimination	"Law or cultural power excludes groups from full civil rights: segregation or apartheid laws, denial of voting rights".	"Pass and enforce laws prohibiting discrimination. Full citizenship and voting rights for all groups."
4. Dehumanization	"One group denies the humanity of the other group. Members of it are equated with animals, vermin, insects, or diseases."	"Local and international leaders should condemn the use of hate speech and make it culturally unacceptable. Leaders who incite genocide should be banned from international travel and have their foreign finances frozen."
5. Organization	"Genocide is always organized... Special army units or militias are often trained and armed..."	"The U.N. should impose arms embargoes on governments and citizens of countries involved in genocidal massacres, and create commissions to investigate violations"
6. Polarization	"Hate groups broadcast polarizing propaganda..."	"Prevention may mean security protection for moderate leaders or assistance to human rights groups...Coups d’état by extremists should be opposed by international sanctions."
7. Preparation	"Mass killing is planned. Victims are identified and separated out because of their ethnic or religious identity..."	"At this stage, a Genocide Emergency must be declared. Full diplomatic pressure by regional organizations must be invoked, including preparation to intervene to prevent genocide."
8. Persecution	"Expropriation, forced displacement, ghettos, concentration camps".	"Direct assistance to victim groups, targeted sanctions against persecutors, mobilization of humanitarian assistance or intervention, protection of refugees."
9. Extermination	"It is 'extermination' to the killers because they do not believe their victims to be fully human".	"At this stage, only rapid and overwhelming armed intervention can stop genocide. Real safe areas or refugee escape corridors should be established with heavily armed international protection."
10. Denial	"The perpetrators... deny that they committed any crimes..."	"The response to denial is punishment by an international tribunal or national courts"

Stanton's Ten Stage Model of the Genocidal Process is widely used in comparative genocide studies, by teachers in schools and universities, and in museums such as the Dallas Holocaust Museum. Stanton's method focuses on events and processes that lead to genocide. The organization he founded, Genocide Watch, monitors events worldwide. It issues Genocide Alerts to policy makers in governments and the UN.

Other genocide scholars have focused on the cultural and political conditions that lead to genocide. Sociologist Helen Fein showed that preexisting antisemitism was correlated with the percentage of Jews killed in different European countries during the Holocaust. Political scientists such as Dr. Barbara Harff have identified political characteristics of states that statistically correlate with risk of genocide. They are prior genocides with impunity; political upheaval; ethnic minority rule; exclusionary ideology; autocracy; closed borders; and massive violations of human rights.

Stanton's model places the risk factors in Harff's analysis of country risks of genocide and politicide into a processual structure. Risks of political instability are characteristic of what Leo Kuper called "divided societies," with deep rifts in Classification. Targeted groups of state-led discrimination are victims of Discrimination. An exclusionary ideology is central to Dehumanization. Autocratic regimes foster the Organization of hate groups. An ethnically polarized elite is characteristic of Polarization. Lack of openness to trade and other influences from outside a state's borders is characteristic of Preparation for genocide or politicide. Massive violation of human rights is evidence of Persecution. Impunity after previous genocides or politicides is evidence of Denial.

Gregory Stanton described genocide prevention in the statement, "Ultimately the best antidote to genocide is popular education and the development of social and cultural tolerance for diversity."

== See also ==
- Genocide education
- Genocide prevention
