= Genocide advocacy =

Genocide advocacy may refer to:

- Anti-genocide advocacy:
  - Prevention of genocide
  - Commemoration of genocide
  - Genocide education
- Pro-genocide advocacy:
  - Incitement to genocide
  - Genocide justification
  - Genocide denial
