= Genocide Watch =

U.S. non-governmental organization

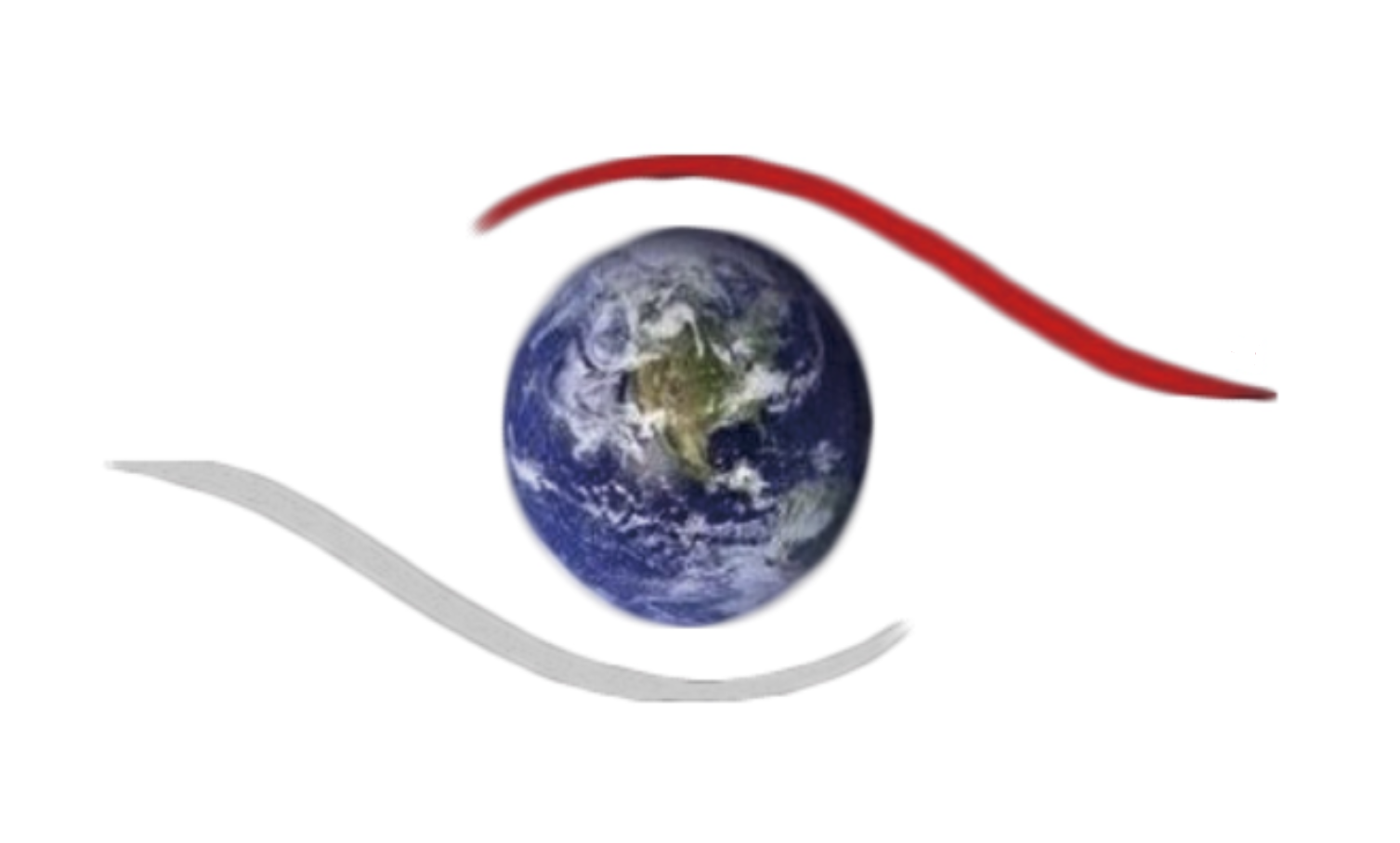
- Founded: 1999
- Founder: Gregory Stanton
- Website: genocidewatch.com

Genocide Watch is a non-governmental organization based in Washington, D.C. which campaigns against genocide, and the various stages running up towards genocide. It was founded by Gregory Stanton in 1999. Genocide Watch is known for its publicizing of Stanton's analysis tool and policy model known as the ten stages of genocide. Genocide Watch is a US registered non-profit and coordinator of the Alliance Against Genocide, which includes 125 organizations in 31 countries, including the Minority Rights Group, the International Crisis Group, the Aegis Trust, and Survival International.

Under the leadership of Stanton, Genocide Watch has formed alliances with dozens of human rights leaders, including Baroness Kennedy and Ewelina Ochab from the Coalition for Genocide Response.

== Positions and statements ==
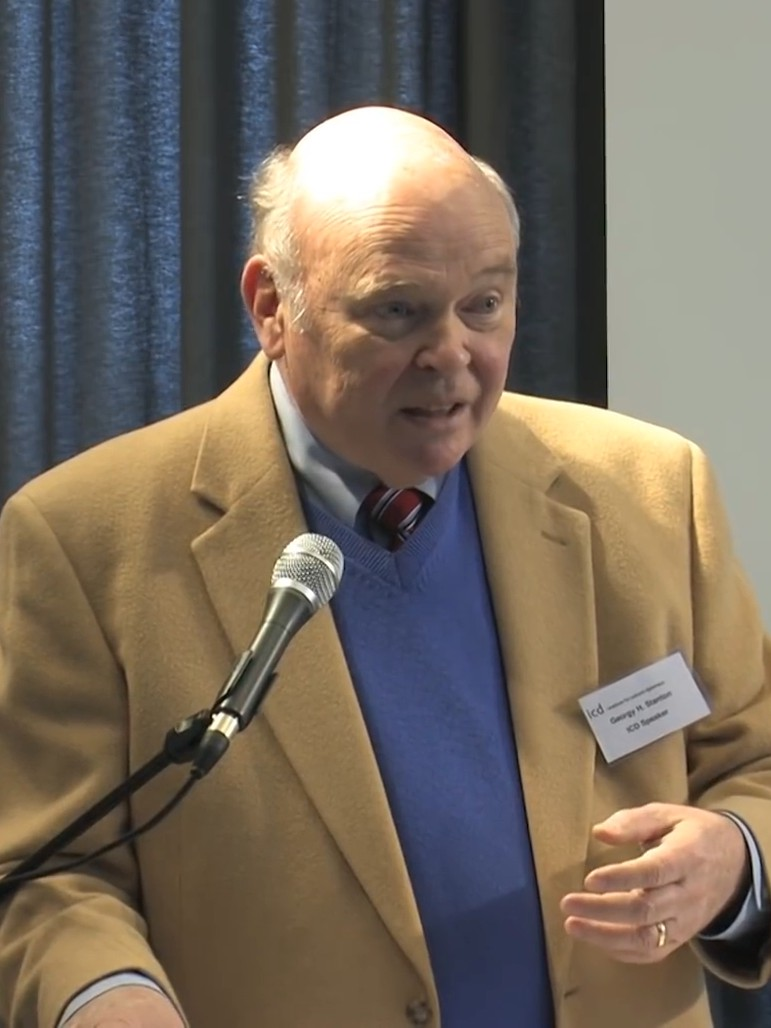
Gregory Stanton in 2012

Stanton has criticized the term "ethnic cleansing", considering it a euphemism for genocide which serves to facilitate genocide denial, whitewash atrocities, and impede genocide prevention.

Stanton also rejects the "only intent" doctrine that the International Court of Justice used in Bosnia v Serbia and Croatia v Serbia. The ICJ found that because Serbia's intent was "ethnic cleansing," Serbia's "sole" and "only" intent was not genocide, and therefore Serbia had not violated the Genocide Convention. According to Stanton, this ICJ precedent may complicate convicting Israel of genocide in Gaza.

The organization issues three levels of alerts: watch, warning, and emergency.

=== Armenia and Nagorno-Karabakh ===
Genocide Watch has released numerous alerts that identify a campaign of genocide against Armenians due to Azerbaijan's 2022-2023 military siege and 2023 offensive in Nagorno-Karabakh and the expulsion of all ethnic Armenians from the territory.

In 2022, Genocide Watch issued a warning against Azerbaijan's "unprovoked" military attacks on Armenia and the Republic of Artsakh. Genocide Watch's earlier alerts in 2020 during the Second Nagorno-Karabakh War drew condemnation from Henry Theriault and Armen Marsoobian — both genocide scholars — for misidentifying the Armenians as perpetrators. Henry Theriault specifically criticizes Genocide Watch's 10-stage stage model of genocide, arguing that it distorted analysis, enabled false accusations, and aided Azerbaijan.

== Board members ==
=== Board of directors ===
- Scott Fisher
- Gregory H. Stanton
- Charles A. Pillsbury

=== Board of advisors ===
There are 34 current members listed as advisors on the board. They include the commander of the United Nations peacekeeping forces in Rwanda Roméo Dallaire, former Nuremberg Prosecutor Benjamin Ferencz, former US Ambassador to the United Nations, former Administrator of the U.S. Agency for International Development (USAID) Samantha Power, and former UN Special Advisers for the Prevention of Genocide Adama Dieng and Alice Nderitu.

== Ten stages of genocide model ==
Genocide Watch is known for its publicizing of Stanton's analysis tool and policy model known as the ten stages of genocide.

The model was created in 1987 and characterizes how genocides occur and what are adequate preventative measures. The stages of genocide are not linear and several of them may occur simultaneously. Stanton's stages are a conceptual model based on analyses of scores of genocides, including the Armenian Genocide, the Holocaust, the Cambodian Genocide, and others that reveal the common processes that lead to genocides. The model enumerates steps whereby a society may evolve towards committing genocide, running from initially increasingly classifying people as "them" or "us", via a number of intermediate stages, including "polarisation", to "extermination" and afterwards to a post-genocide phase when the perpetrators deny that they committed any crimes.

== History ==
Genocide Watch was founded in 1999.

In 2010, Genocide Watch was the first organization to assert that the 1980s Gukurahundi massacres in Zimbabwe met the definition of genocide, calling for the prosecution of Zimbabwean leaders including president Robert Mugabe.

In 2020, Genocide Watch joined other human rights groups urging the U.N. Human Rights Council (UNHRC) to investigate the actions of the Chinese government regarding Uyghurs and other Turkic Muslim minorities in the Xinjiang region, and demand that China end persecution of Uyghurs that amount to acts of genocide.

In the case of Bosco Ntaganda within the International Criminal Court investigation in the Democratic Republic of the Congo, Genocide Watch submitted amicus curiae observations along with the Antiquities Coalition and Blue Shield International, on the interpretation of attacks on cultural property in the Rome Statute.

In recent years, Genocide Watch have also published a number of reports and statements: the 'United States of America Report' highlighting genocidal aspects of racial tension in the US, a number of statements regarding the Russia-Ukraine Genocide which conclude that Russia's Ukraine War is genocidal, and statements regarding the Israel-Gaza conflict, which describe both Hamas' initial attack and some of Israel's military response as genocidal.
