= Predictions of a genocide in Ethiopia =

Predictions of a genocide in Ethiopia, particularly one that targets Tigrayans, Amharas and/or Oromos, have frequently occurred during the 2020s, particularly in the context of the Tigray War and Ethiopia's broader civil conflict.

Organizations related to the international Jewish community and otherwise involved in commemorating the Holocaust, such as the United States Holocaust Memorial Museum, have expressed alarm over the acts of mass violence occurring inside Ethiopia. In October 2022, the Museum issued a public statement declaring a "heightened risk" and concluding: "Ethnic-based targeting and the commission of mass atrocities have been an intentional strategy of parties to the conflict between the Ethiopian and regional Tigrayan governments".

== Context ==
Helen Clark, Michael Lapsley and David Alton, writing in The Guardian stated that the reasons for the Rwandan genocide and crimes such as the Bosnian genocide of the Yugoslav Wars had been analysed in depth and that methods of preventing future genocides had been extensively discussed. They described the analyses as producing "reams of paper [that] were dedicated to analysing the past and pledging to heed warning signs and prevent genocide". A group of 34 non-governmental organizations and 31 individuals, calling themselves African Citizens, referred to the Rwanda: The Preventable Genocide report prepared by a panel headed by former Botswana president Quett Masire for the Organisation of African Unity. African Citizens highlighted the sentences, "Indisputably, the most important truth that emerges from our investigation is that the Rwandan genocide could have been prevented by those in the international community who had the position and means to do so. ... The world failed Rwanda. ... [The United Nations] simply did not care enough about Rwanda to intervene appropriately." Chidi Odinkalu, former head of the National Human Rights Commission of Nigeria, was one of the African Citizens.

== Factors ==
African Citizens and Clark, Lapsley & Alton listed factors that they saw as predicting a genocide, while Genocide Watch predicted a genocide based on the model of a genocide going through stages, which may overlap chronologically.

=== Ethnic identity of rebel groups ===
The ethnic identities of the Tigray Defense Forces–Oromo Liberation Army (TDF–OLA) coalition were seen by African Citizens as a factor predicting an Ethiopian genocide.

=== Federal government hate speech ===
African Citizens saw the federal Ethiopian government as "appeal[ing] to narrow identity [and] programming its populations for a campaign of extermination against populations almost exclusively defined by ethnicity." Clark, Lapsley & Alton described government officials and allies as promoting ethnic-based hate speech using terms including "cancer," "weeds," "rats" and "terrorists". Administrator of USAID Samantha Power stated in August 2021 that she was concerned about the "dehumanising rhetoric" used by government forces, fearing it would make already existing tensions even worse. Genocide Watch accused prime minister Abiy Ahmed of hate speech, incitement to commit genocide and genocidal intent. On 20 November, Genocide Watch classified the Ethiopian situation as including stage 4 of genocide, dehumanization.

=== Distribution of weapons to civilians ===
African Citizens described the federal and Amhara Region governments as "distributing crude arms to neighbourhood and popular militias and programming them for the extermination in the name of self-defence." Clark, Lapsley & Alton described the authorities as having "mobilised ... militias and vigilante groups, organised on an ethnic basis and with an ethnic agenda. [The authorities] armed them and granted them impunity."

=== Censorship and polarization ===
Clark, Lapsley & Alton described the effect of censorship and intimidation of national and international media as "eliminating any middle ground". On 20 November, Genocide Watch classified the Ethiopian situation as including stage 6 of genocide, polarization.

=== Ethnic-based detention camps ===
African Citizens estimated the number of Tigrayans held in detention camps "just for the crime of who they are or where they come from" to be 40,000 on 26 November 2021. Clark, Lapsley & Alton estimated, on the same date, 30,000 Tigrayan civilians detained in Addis Ababa, 15,000 Tigrayan military detained since late 2020, and unknown numbers of Tigrayans held in western Tigray and elsewhere in Ethiopia. On 20 November, Genocide Watch classified the Ethiopian situation as including stage 8 of genocide, persecution.

=== Continuation of gross international law violations ===
Genocide Watch argued that precedents during the Tigray War of "extrajudicial killings, sexual violence, and torture, ... [and] ethnic militias that [were] committing crimes against humanity," by all parties to the conflict, including the federal government against Tigrayans, the Tigray People's Liberation Front (TPLF) against Amharas, and the Ethiopian National Defense Force against Oromos, included "genocidal violence" that risked amplifying into a threat to "all of Ethiopia". On 20 November, Genocide Watch classified the Ethiopian situation as already including stage 9 of genocide, extermination.

Clark, Lapsley & Alton argued that prior to late November 2021, "only one side [had] committed violations on a scale and nature that could credibly qualify as genocide ... the coalition of the Ethiopian government, under the prime minister, Abiy Ahmed; the Amhara regional government; and the state of Eritrea".

=== Lack of international reactions ===
African Citizens argued that the United Nations and the African Union had, as of 26 November, "failed to take any concrete steps to prevent the real likelihood of imminent mass extermination, beginning with all the internees." Clark, Lapsley & Alton described the international community as being "divided, confused and indecisive". They described the African Union as having "listened deferentially to the government's denials and obfuscations," European powers as having "dithered" and the United States (US) as having "toned down its condemnations".

=== Trigger event ===
African Citizens predicted that the threat of Addis Ababa being taken over by TDF–OLA would, if the genocide factors of 26 November 2021 remained in place, be likely to trigger an "exterminat[ion]" of "the internees – wherever they are held".

== Calls for genocide prevention ==
On 20 November 2021, Genocide Watch called for the predicted genocide to be prevented. On 21 November, Chidi Odinkalu called for genocide prevention, stating, "We need to focus on an urgent programme of Genocide Prevention advocacy on Ethiopia NOW. It may be too late in 2 weeks, guys." On 26 November, African Citizens and Clark, Lapsley & Alton also called for the predicted genocide to be prevented.

Organizations related to the international Jewish community and otherwise involved in commemorating the Holocaust, such as the United States Holocaust Memorial Museum, expressed alarm over the conflict's events. In October 2022, the Museum issued a public statement declaring a "heightened risk" and concluding: "Ethnic-based targeting and the commission of mass atrocities have been an intentional strategy of parties to the conflict between the Ethiopian and regional Tigrayan governments".

== See also ==
- Tigray Genocide
- War crimes in the Tigray War#Genocide claims
- Persecution of Amhara people
- Ethnic discrimination in Ethiopia
  - Ethnic violence against Amaro Koore
  - Ethnic violence in Konso
