= ICEG =

ICEG may refer to:

- Intracardiac electrogram
- International Campaign to End Genocide, a coalition coordinated by Genocide Watch
