= Ten stages of genocide =

Academic model explaining how genocides occur

The ten stages of genocide is an academic tool and a policy model which was created in 1987 by Gregory Stanton, American jurist, former research professor and founding president of Genocide Watch. The model characterizes how genocides occur and what are adequate preventative measures. The stages of genocide are not linear and several of them may occur simultaneously. Stanton's stages are a conceptual model based on analyses of scores of genocides, including the Armenian Genocide, the Holocaust, the Cambodian Genocide, the Rwandan genocide, the Darfur, Myanmar, Bosnian, Bangladesh, and other genocides that reveal the common processes that lead to genocides.

Stanton's model is widely used in the teaching of comparative genocide studies in a variety of settings, ranging from university courses to museum education, settings which include the Dallas Holocaust and Human Rights Museum. The model is based on the structuralist theories of Jean Piaget and Noam Chomsky that describe the transformations in human cognition and language.

== History ==
Stanton developed the model after directing a relief program in Phnom Penh, Cambodia in 1980. He published the model in the 1987 Faulds Lecture at Warren Wilson College. The model originally contained eight stages of genocide, but in 2012 he added two additional stages: discrimination and persecution.

In 1996, Stanton presented a briefing paper called "The 8 Stages of Genocide" to the United States Department of State. In the paper, he suggested that genocides occur in eight stages that are "predictable but not inexorable". (Note: The FBI has found that somewhat similar stages occur when hate groups are formed) Each 'stage' or process can be countered with preventive measures. The suggested intervention measures are ones that the United States government and NATO could implement or influence other European and African nations to implement including diplomacy or as a last resort, military intervention.

== Model ==
The first stage, classification, involves the division of people into "us" and "them" based on perceived differences such as ethnicity, religion, or nationality. The stage of symbolization involves the assignment of names or symbols onto the classifications, identifying members of the "other" group. Nazi yellow stars imposed on Jews were a classic example. When combined with the stage of "discrimination" or the stage of "dehumanization," a dominant group may develop an ideology of superiority over an oppressed group, creating justifications for genocide and crimes against humanity. Whole groups may be excluded from classification as "citizens" in order to justify discrimination against them and exclusion from their human rights. Discrimination and dehumanization impose stereotypes on the targeted group that reinforce their inferior status in the eyes of the perpetrators. Dehumanization makes murder without guilt possible for perpetrators, because they are convinced they are purifying society by ridding it of "rats" or "cockroaches." This can manifest in the form of hate symbols, propaganda, or incendiary speech that seeks to justify violence against the targeted group. These stages may be followed by organization of hate groups and polarization, in which extremists target moderates as class or group enemies. In the preparation stage, perpetrators plan the genocide and mobilize support for their genocidal campaign. Crimes against the targeted group intensify into persecution, in order to isolate and marginalize the targeted group. The stage of killing, destruction of conditions of life, prevention of births, and kidnapping children is extermination of members of the targeted group. At this stage, lawyers may finally be willing to recognize the crime of "Genocide." From the beginning of the genocidal process to long afterwards, perpetrators deny that they committed any crimes. This is the stage of denial, which begins and follows every genocide, sometimes lasting for centuries.

#	Stage	Characteristics	Preventative measures
1	Classification	People are divided into "them and us".	"The main preventive measure at this early stage is to develop universalistic institutions that transcend... divisions."
2	Symbolization	"When combined with hatred, symbols may be forced upon unwilling members of pariah groups..."	"To combat symbolization, hate symbols can be legally forbidden as can hate speech."
3	Discrimination	"Law or cultural power excludes groups from full civil rights: segregation or apartheid laws, denial of voting rights".	"Pass and enforce laws prohibiting discrimination. Full citizenship and voting rights for all groups."
4	Dehumanization	"One group denies the humanity of the other group. Members of it are equated with animals, vermin, insects, excrement or diseases."	"Local and international leaders should condemn the use of hate speech and make it culturally unacceptable. Leaders who incite genocide should be banned from international travel and have their foreign finances frozen."
5	Organization	"Genocide is always organized... Special army units or militias are often trained and armed..."	"The U.N. should impose arms embargoes on governments and citizens of countries involved in genocidal massacres, and create commissions to investigate violations."
6	Polarization	"Extremists drive the groups apart... Leaders are arrested and murdered... laws erode fundamental civil rights and liberties."	"Prevention may mean security protection for moderate leaders or assistance to human rights groups... Coups d'état by extremists should be opposed by international sanctions."
7	Preparation	"Mass killing is planned. Victims are identified and separated because of their ethnic or religious identity..."	"At this stage, a Genocide Emergency must be declared. Full diplomatic pressure by regional organizations must be invoked, including preparation to intervene to prevent genocide."
8	Persecution	"Expropriation, forced displacement, ghettos, concentration camps".	"Direct assistance to victim groups, targeted sanctions against persecutors, mobilization of humanitarian assistance or intervention, protection of refugees."
9	Extermination	"It is 'extermination' to the killers because they do not believe their victims to be fully human".	"At this stage, only rapid and overwhelming armed intervention can stop genocide. Real safe areas or refugee escape corridors should be established with heavily armed international protection."
10	Denial	"The perpetrators... deny that they committed any crimes..."	"The response to denial is punishment by an international tribunal or national courts."

== Analysis ==
Henry Theriault, genocide scholar, argues that the stage model is flawed because it treats denial as a final or discrete stage of genocide, whereas denial is a non-essential rhetorical strategy that can occur before, during, after, or be superseded by the "consolidation" the victims’ permanent marginalization or erasure.

== See also ==
- Risk factors for genocide
- Genocide education
- Genocide prevention
- Genocide studies
- Anne Frank Human Rights Memorial
- Holodomor Genocide Memorial
- Psychology of genocide
- United States Holocaust Memorial Museum
- Yad Vashem
- Bosnia genocide
- Rwandan genocide
- Gaza genocide
- Transgender genocide
