= Jennifer Welsh =

Canadian professor

Jennifer Welsh FRSC
- Born: Jennifer Mary Welsh; 1965 (age 60–61); Regina, Saskatchewan, Canada

Academic background
- Education: University of Saskatchewan; University of Oxford
- Thesis: Edmund Burke and International Relations: The Commonwealth of Europe and the Crusade Against the French Revolution (1992)
- Doctoral advisors: Sudhir Hazareesingh; Andrew Hurrell

Academic work
- Discipline: Political scientist
- Sub-discipline: International relations, Foreign policy
- Institutions: McGill University, University of Oxford, European University Institute, University of Toronto
- Main interests: Humanitarian intervention, The Responsibility to Protect, Human rights
- Website: www.mcgill.ca/maxbellschool/our-people/mpp-teaching-faculty/jennifer-welsh

Jennifer Mary Welsh FRSC (born 1965) is a Canadian professor of international relations, currently working as the Canada 150 Research Chair in Global Governance and Security at McGill University. Welsh is the director of the Centre for International Peace and Security Studies at McGill's Max Bell School of Public Policy, and a co-director of the Canadian Research Network on Women, Peace and Security. Welsh is a frequent commentator in Canadian media on foreign affairs.

Prior to her appointment at McGill, Welsh was a professor in International Relations at the University of Oxford from 1999 to 2014, where she also co-founded the Oxford Institute for Ethics, Law and Armed Conflict. From 2014 to 2019, Welsh was the chair in International Relations at the European University Institute (Florence), where she directed a five-year European Research Council project on the ethics and law of contemporary armed conflict.

== Education ==
Welsh has a Bachelor of Arts in Political Science and Economics from the University of Saskatchewan (1987), where she received the Governor General's Academic Medal (Gold). Welsh was named a Rhodes Scholar (1987) and completed a Master's and Doctorate in International Relations from the University of Oxford (1987–1992).

== Career ==
From 1997 to 1998, Welsh was a professor and associate director of the Peace & Conflict Studies Programme at the University of Toronto. Welsh was a lecturer in International Relations at the University of Oxford (1999–2006) and was appointed a full professor in 2006.

Welsh has engaged in a number of policy processes related to international peace and security and Canadian foreign policy. In 2005, she was the lead writer for the International Policy Statement for the Government of Canada. From 2013 to 2016 Welsh was served as Assistant Secretary General and Special Advisor to UN Secretary-General Ban Ki-Moon on the Responsibility to Protect – a position in which she helped to further develop and implement the principle within and beyond the UN system. She delivered the 2016 Massey Lectures.

Welsh currently works as the Canada 150 Research Chair in Global Governance and Security and serves as the director of the Centre for International Peace and Security Studies (CIPSS) at McGill University. She is also a professor at the Max Bell School of Public Policy, and the co-director of the Research Network on Women, Peace and Security.

Welsh has also served as consultant to several organizations, including McKinsey and Co, Aspen Institute’s Business and Society Program, and the Government of Canada.

Welsh has also served on the boards or in an advisory role for numerous organizations, including the Walter and Duncan Gordon Foundation, the Peace Research Institute of Frankfurt, the Auschwitz Institute for Peace and Reconciliation, the Global Centre for the Responsibility to Protect, and the Trudeau Foundation.

Welsh was elected as an International Honorary Member of the American Academy of Arts and Sciences in 2021, and as a Fellow of the Royal Society of Canada in 2022.

== Publications ==
- 1995 Author, Edmund Burke and International Relations (Macmillan/St. Martin's Press)
- 1998 Co author, Chips & Pop: Decoding the Nexus Generation (Malcolm Lester Books)
- 1999 Co-editor, Empire and Community: Edmund Burke's Writings and Speeches on International Relations (Westview Press)
- 2003 Editor, Humanitarian Intervention and International Relations (Oxford University Press)
- 2004 Author, At Home in the World: Canada’s Global Vision for the 21st Century (HarperCollins)
- 2007 Co-editor, Exporting Good Governance: Temptations and Challenges in Canada’s Aid Program (Wilfrid Laurier University Press)
- 2008 Co-editor, The United Nations Security Council and War: The Evolution of Thought and Practice since 1945 (Oxford University Press)
- 2013 Co-editor, Just and Unjust Military Intervention: European Political Thought from Vitoria to Mill (Cambridge University Press)
- 2015 Co-editor, The Responsibility to Prevent: Overcoming the Challenges of Atrocity Prevention (Oxford University Press
- 2016 Author, The Return of History: Conflict, Migration, and Geopolitics in the Twenty-First Century (House of Anansi Press Inc.)
