= Alice Wairimu Nderitu =

Kenyan peace and conflict researcher (born 1968)

Alice Wairimũ Nderitũ
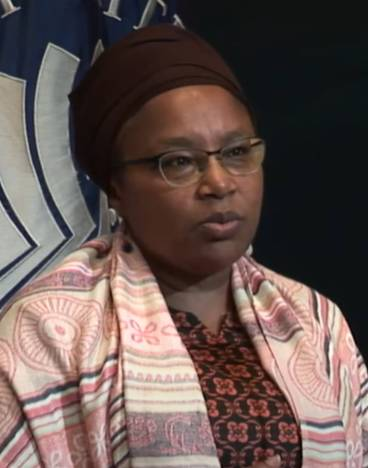
- Nderitu in a 2022 interview with the United States Institute of Peace
- Born: 9 January 1968 (age 58); Nairobi, Kenya
- Education: University of Nairobi (B.A. and Master's)
- Occupations: Conflict researcher and mediator
- Known for: United Nations Under-Secretary-General and Special Adviser on the Prevention of Genocide
- Awards: Woman Peace Maker of the Year, awarded by the Joan B. Kroc Institute for Peace and Justice, University of San Diego (2012); Honorary Doctor of Humane Letters from Keene State College (2022); Avance Media's 100 Most Influential African Women (2023).

Alice Wairimũ Nderitũ (born 9 January 1968 in Nairobi, Kenya) is a Kenyan mediator who formerly served as the United Nations Special Adviser on the Prevention of Genocide under United Nations Secretary-General António Guterres from 2020 to 2024.

== Early life and education ==
Nderitū was born in Nairobi, Kenya. She holds a Bachelor of Arts in Literature and Philosophy (1990) and a Master's degree in Armed Conflict and Peace Studies (2013) from the University of Nairobi, and an Honorary Doctor of Humane Letters from Keene State College.

== Career ==
=== 1992–2009 ===
==== Kenya Prisons Service ====
From 1992 to 1999, Nderitū was Researcher and Administrator of the Kenya Prisons Service within the Kenya Ministry of Home Affairs.

==== Kenya National Commission on Human Rights ====
From 1999 to 2007, she headed the human rights education department (the Human Rights Education and Capacity-Building Programme) of the Kenya National Commission on Human Rights (earlier, known as the Kenya Standing Committee on Human Rights).

==== Fahamu ====
From 2007 to 2009, Nderitū served as Director of Education for Social Justice at the non-profit human rights organization Fahamu.

=== 2009–present ===
==== Commissioner of Kenyan National Cohesion and Integration Commission ====
From 2009 to 2013, Nderitū served as a Commissioner of the National Cohesion and Integration Commission in Kenya, established to mediate religious, ethnic, and race-related conflicts, counter hate speech, and promote peaceful coexistence. She was one of three mediators (the other two were men) of the Nakuru Accord, between ten ethnic communities to prevent a repeat of the country's 2007-08 election violence that had included an estimated 1,500 deaths, 3,000 rapes, and 650,000 displaced residents. For 16 months in her role as Commissioner she was a founder and first Co-Chair of Uwiano Platform for Peace, a conflict-prevention agency founded in 2010 that uses mobile technology to encourage citizens to report indicators of violence, linking early warning to early response. She would later travel to Myanmar to help design and put in place the country's first early warning linked to early response program.

==== Member of Kenya National Committee on the Prevention and Punishment of the Crime of Genocide, War Crimes, Crimes Against Humanity and all Forms of Discrimination ====
Starting in 2013, Nderitū served as a member of the Kenya National Committee on the Prevention and Punishment of the Crime of Genocide, War Crimes, Crimes Against Humanity and all Forms of Discrimination. She also served as an Auschwitz Institute for the Prevention of Genocide and Mass Atrocities instructor. She also served as Summer Course faculty member at SIT Graduate Institute, Vermont, Brattleboro, USA, and lecturer of the Socio-Economic Rights course at Pretoria University's Centre for Human Rights, South Africa. She has also served as facilitator of the Senior Mission Leaders Course at the International Peace Support Training Center, Kenya and the Rwanda Military Academy, Rwanda.

==== Commissioner of Kenyan Presidential Commission of Inquiry ====
Nderitū served as a Commissioner of the Presidential Commission of Inquiry into the dissolution of the Makueni County government in Kenya.

==== Mediations ====
She has contributed in defining the role of women mediators, as a signatory and mediator to peace agreements in armed conflicts. Committed to communities and linking the local with the global, Nderitū has also been an advocate of women inclusion in various international forums.

Nderitū led the mediation process that led to the 2012 peace agreement signed by 10 ethnic communities in Nakuru, Kenya. For 16 months, she led the crafting the peace process with 100 elders and three mediators.

She was also the lead mediator in a peace process in Kaduna State, Nigeria.^{[9]} It led to the signing of the 2016 Kafanchan Peace Declaration by 29 ethnic communities.^{[9]}

Nderitū was the lead mediator in a peace process in Southern Plateau, Nigeria.^{[9]} It led to 56 ethnic communities signing the Southern Plateau Inter-Communal Peace Declaration in 2017.^{[11][9]}

==== UN Under-Secretary-General and Special Advisor on the Prevention of Genocide ====
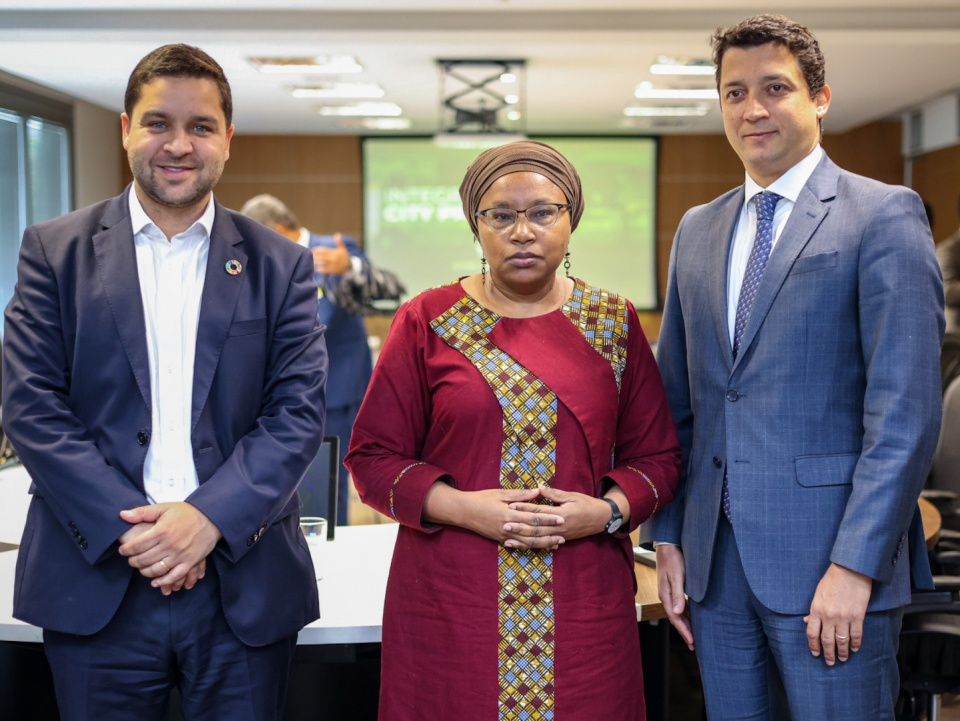
Nderitu meeting with Brazil's Rio de Janeiro Governor Thiago Pampolha and Prosecutor-General Bruno Dubeux (2023)

In 2020, United Nations Secretary-General Antonio Guterres appointed Nderitū the UN's Under-Secretary-General and Special Advisor on the Prevention of Genocide. The Secretary-General described her as a "recognized voice in the field of peacebuilding and violence prevention" due to her conflict-resolution efforts. In November 2024, Nderitū's contract as Special Advisor on the Prevention of Genocide was not renewed. The Wall Street Journal editorial board argued that Nderitū's contract was not renewed because she did not label Israel's conduct in the Gaza war as genocide. A UN spokesman denied this and noted that UN officials often serve one term, including most of the people who previously held Nderitū's position. In a February 2025 interview, Nderitū stated that she had been "hounded" for her stance on the Gaza war, including an anonymous letter from UN staff, frequent questions from the media, and social media harassment. She stated that it is the role of the courts to ascertain if there is a genocide in Gaza.

== Organizations ==
Nderitū has served as a member of the African Union's Network of African Women in Conflict Prevention and Mediation (Fem-Wise), the Women Waging Peace Network, the Concerned Citizens for Peace (a group of Elders facilitating peace between African leaders), and the Global Alliance of Women Mediators. She is also the founder of the Community Voices for Peace and Pluralism, a network of African women professionals preventing and transforming conflicts worldwide. She was also a Commonwealth Exchange Fellow at the South African Human Rights Commission.

== Recognition ==
- 2011 – Transitional Justice Fellow, Institute for Justice and Reconciliation (IJR), South Africa
- 2012 – Woman Peace Maker Of the Year, awarded by the Joan B. Kroc Institute for Peace and Justice, University of San Diego, US
- 2014 – Raphael Lemkin - the Auschwitz Institute for Peace and Reconciliation (AIPG)
- 2015 – Aspen Leadership scholarship
- 2017 – Global Pluralism Award, awarded by Global Centre for Pluralism (His Highness the Aga Khan and the Government of Canada) for commitment to conflict prevention throughout Africa and innovative approach to mediation.
- 2018 – Jack P. Blaney Award, awarded by the Morris J. Wosk Centre for Dialogue, Simon Fraser University for using dialogue to support conflict resolution including but not limited to roles in Kenya and Nigeria
- 2019 – Diversity and Inclusion Peace and Cohesion Champion Award, Kenya National Diversity Inclusion Award (DIAR awards)
- 2022 – Honorary Doctor of Humane Letters Degree, Keene State College
- 2023 – Avance Media's 100 Most Influential African Women

== Publications ==
- Wairimu Nderitu, Mukami Kimathi – Mau Mau Woman Freedom Fighter
- Anass Bendrif, Sahira al Karaguly, Mohammadi Laghzaoui, Esmah Lahlah, Maeve Moynihan, Alice Nderitũ, Joelle Rizk, and Maytham Al Zubaidi (2009). An introduction to human rights in the Middle East and North Africa- a guide for NGOs.
- Alice Nderitũ and Jacqueline O'Neill (2013). "7 myths standing in the way of women's inclusion". Inclusive Security.
- Alice Wairimũ Nderitũ (2014). The Nakuru County peace accord (2010-2012).
- Alice Wairimũ Nderitũ (2016). African Peace Building: Civil Society Roles in Conflict. In Pamela Aall and Chester A. Crocker (eds). Minding the Gap: African Conflict Management in a Time of Change (2016).
- Alice Wairimũ Nderitũ (2016). Catherine Ndereba: The Authorised Biography of a Marathon World Record holder
- Alice Wairimũ Nderitũ (2018). Beyond Ethnicism: Exploring Ethnic and Racial Diversity for Educators. Mdahalo Bridging Divides Limited.
- Alice Wairimũ Nderitũ (2018). Kenya: Bridging Ethnic Divides, A Commissioner’s Experience on Cohesion and Integration. Mdahalo Bridging Divides Limited.
- Swanee Hunt and Alice Wairimũ Nderitũ. (2018). WPS as a political movement. In Sara E. Davies & Jacqui True (Eds). The Oxford Handbook of Women, Peace, and Security. New York: Oxford University Press.
- Alice Wairimu Nderitu. Conflict Transformation and Human Rights: A Mutual Stalemate ?

In addition, Nderitu is a columnist with The EastAfrican newspaper.
