= Genocide denial =

Attempt to deny the scale and severity of genocide

Genocide denial is the attempt to deny or minimize the scale and severity of an instance of genocide. Denial is an integral part of genocide and includes the secret planning of genocide, propaganda while the genocide is going on, and destruction of evidence of mass killings.

Denial is considered a genocidal process, the final stage, and a catalyst or indicator of future atrocities. Prominent examples include: the denial of the Armenian, Bosnian, Cambodian, Gazan and Rwandan genocides, denial of the Holocaust, and denial of genocides against colonized indigenous peoples.

The distinction between historical revisionism and historical negationism, including genocide denial, rests upon the techniques and motivations which are used.

Historical revisionists and negationists rewrite history in order to support an agenda, which is usually political or ideological, by using falsification and rhetorical fallacies in order to obtain their desired results. Exposure of genocide denial and revisionism surged in the early 21st century, facilitated by the propagation of conspiracy theories and hate speech on social media.

== Academic analysis ==
Genocide Watch states that denial "is among the surest indicators of further genocidal massacres".

Historian, Richard Hovannisian states, "Complete annihilation of a people requires the banishment of recollection and suffocation of remembrance. Falsification, deception and half-truths reduce what was, to what might have been or perhaps what was not at all." According to historian Taner Akçam, "the practice of 'denialism' in regard to mass atrocities is usually thought of as a simple denial of the facts, but this is not true. Rather, it is in that nebulous territory between facts and truth where such denialism germinates."

David Tolbert, president of the International Center for Transitional Justice, states:

Denial is the final fortress of those who commit genocide and other mass crimes. Perpetrators hide the truth to avoid accountability and protect the political and economic advantages they sought to gain by mass killings and theft of the victims' property, and to cement the new reality by manufacturing an alternative history. Recent studies have established that such denial not only damages the victims and their destroyed communities, it promises a future based on lies, sowing the seeds of future conflict, repression and suffering.

=== Motives ===
The main reasons for denying genocide are to evade moral or even criminal responsibility and to protect the perpetrators' reputation or justify their actions. For scholars, another may be careerism.

=== Strategies ===
Denialist strategies include questioning statistics, denial of intent, definitional debates, blaming the victim (sometimes called "mirroring"), claiming self-defense, media disinformation campaigns, and challenging the victims' group identity. Another strategy is to deny the existence of the protected group.

Genocide scholar Israel Charny outlines five psychological characteristics of denials of genocide.

Certain denialist phrases are elaborated by genocide scholars Adam Jones:

- "Hardly anybody died"— When the genocides lie far in the past, denial is easier.
- "It wasn't intentional" — Disease and famine-causing conditions such as forced labor, concentration camps and slavery (even though they may be manufactured by the perpetrator) may be blamed for casualties.
- "There weren't that many people to begin with" Minimizing the casualties of the victims, while the criminals destroy or hide the evidence.
- "It was self defense" — The killing of civilians, especially able bodied males is rationalized in preemptive attack, as they are accused of plotting against the perpetrators. The perpetrator may exterminate witnesses and relatives of the victims.
- "There was no central direction" — Perpetrators can use militias, paramilitaries, mercenaries, or death squads to avoid being seen as directly participating.
- "It wasn't or isn't 'genocide,' because ..." —Perpetrators may enter definitional or rhetorical argumentation.
- "We would never do that" — Self-image cannot be questioned: the perpetrator sees itself as benevolent by definition. Evidence doesn't matter.
- "We are the real victims" — Perpetrators deflect attention to their own casualties/losses, without historical context.

One commonality among genocide deniers is the unwillingness to change their position in response to overwhelming evidence to the contrary.

== Prominent examples of denial by non-governmental entities ==
- In his 1984 book The Other Side: The Secret Relationship Between Nazism and Zionism Palestinian President Mahmoud Abbas argued that only "a few hundred thousand" Jews were murdered in the Holocaust, the Jews brought the Holocaust upon themselves because of their behavior, and Zionists had collaborated with the Nazis in an attempt to send more Jews to Israel. In a 2006 interview, without retracting these specific claims, he stated: "The Holocaust was a terrible, unforgivable crime against the Jewish nation, a crime against humanity that cannot be accepted by humankind."
- In February 2006 David Irving was imprisoned in Austria for Holocaust denial; he served 13 months in prison before being released on probation.
- David Campbell has written of the now defunct British magazine Living Marxism that "LM's intentions are clear from the way they have sought to publicize accounts of contemporary atrocities which suggest they were certainly not genocidal (as in the case of Rwanda), and perhaps did not even occur (as in the case of the murder of nearly 8,000 at Srebrenica)." Chris McGreal writing in The Guardian on 20 March 2000 stated that Fiona Fox writing under a pseudonym had contributed an article to Living Marxism which was part of a campaign by Living Marxism that denied that the event which occurred in Rwanda was a genocide.
- Scott Jaschik has stated that Justin McCarthy, is one of two scholars "most active on promoting the view that no Armenian genocide took place". He was one of four scholars who participated in a controversial debate hosted by PBS about the genocide.
- Darko Trifunovic is the author of the Report about Case Srebrenica, which was commissioned by the government of the Republika Srpska. The International Criminal Tribunal for the former Yugoslavia (ICTY) reviewed the report and concluded that it "represented one of the worst examples of revisionism, in relation to the mass executions of Bosniaks committed in Srebrenica in July 1995". After the report was published on 3 September 2002, it provoked outrage and condemnation by a wide variety of Balkans and international figures, individuals, and organizations.
- Patrick Karuretwa stated in the Harvard Law Record that in 2007 the Canadian politician Robin Philpot "attracted intense media attention for repeatedly denying the 1994 genocide of the Tutsis"
- On 21 April 2016 a full-page ad appeared in The Wall Street Journal and Chicago Tribune that directed readers to Fact Check Armenia, a genocide denial website sponsored by the Turkish lobby in the US. When confronted about the ad a Wall Street Journal spokesperson stated, "We accept a wide range of advertisements, including those with provocative viewpoints. While we review ad copy for issues of taste, the varied and divergent views expressed belong to the advertisers."
- American philosopher Steven T. Katz has argued that the Holocaust is the only genocide that has occurred in history.

== Prominent examples of denial by governments ==
=== Australia ===
The Australian government has been criticized for engaging in genocide denial and historic revisionism, concerning the treatment of Indigenous people. Prominent Australian politicians have refused to acknowledge the genocide.

=== Azerbaijan ===
Azerbaijan and Turkey are among two countries which officially deny the Armenian Genocide and glorify previous genocidal acts against Armenians. Eldad Aharon, foreign policy analyst, states that Turkey's denial of the Armenian Genocide is "fundamental to Azerbaijan's national identity," reinforcing their solidarity within the "one nation, two states" framework. Vicken Cheterian states that the conflict between Armenia and Azerbaijan is deeply influenced by the denial of the Armenian Genocide. Human rights advocates have also criticized Azerbaijan for denying contemporary violence against Armenians.

Arsène Saparov, Caucasus expert, states that "the persistent Azerbaijani policy of denial of the Armenian presence and cultural heritage in the Caucasus...has been institutionalized since Ilham Aliyev became president." Following Nagorno-Karabakh's incorporation into Azerbaijan after a military offensive, the Azerbaijani government has undertaken a campaign of Turkification and the destruction of Armenian cultural sites, which aims at denying Armenians' historical presence and justifying their expulsion. Roxanne Makasdjian, executive director of The Genocide Education Project, has stated that "Turkey and Azerbaijan collaborate in a policy of denying the Armenian genocide" in order to erase Armenia and "pave the way for a large ‘Pan-Turkic’ bloc'."

Henry Theriault states that in Turkish and Azeri society denial coexists with the celebration of genocidal acts because there is no accountability: “in such situations, denial is inverted into celebratory or invective declaration...Thus, Turkey’s president Recep Tayyip Erdoğan’s supporters can make explicit statements about completing the genocide of 1915 to eliminate all Armenians, referred to...by Erdoğan as 'leftovers of the sword[s]' that were swung one hundred five years ago...”

=== Canada ===
Despite decades of recognition and acknowledgments, residential school denialism is a factor within Canadian society. In 2022, Gregory Stanton, former president of the International Association of Genocide Scholars, issued a report stating Canada is in the "denial stage" of the ten stages of genocide.

External videos
- "Mythbusting Residential Schools were well-intentioned" (2024) – Sean Carleton - University of Manitoba (2:43 min)

On National Truth and Reconciliation Day in 2023, prime minister Justin Trudeau stating that denialism was on the rise after disputes regarding the conclusiveness of the evidence of Indian residential schools gravesite discoveries. Federal Justice Minister David Lametti said in 2023 that he was open to outlawing residential school denialism.

Kimberly Murray from the Office of the Independent Special Interlocutor, released a report in 2023 starting;

Some still deny that children suffered physical, sexual, psychological, cultural, and spiritual abuses, despite the TRC’s indisputable evidence to the contrary. Others try to deny and minimize the destructive impacts of the Indian Residential Schools. They believe Canada’s historical myth that the nation has treated Indigenous Peoples with benevolence and generosity is true.

The report prompted Leah Gazan, an NDP Member of Parliament, to introduce Bill C-413 in 2024, which would ban residential school denialism. However, legal scholars have previously asserted that a bill of this nature probably would not pass a constitutional challenge under the Canadian Charter.

=== Croatia ===
Croatia's far-right often advocates the false theory that Jasenovac was a "labour camp" where mass murder did not take place. Some rights activists say that distortion of World War II crimes exist in Croatia and it was especially prevalent during the 1990s war when anti-Serb sentiment was high. One prominent promoter of this is the far-right NGO "The Society for Research of the Threefold Jasenovac Camp". Its members include journalist Igor Vukić and academic Josip Pečarić who have written books promoting this theory. The Ideas promoted by its members have been amplified by mainstream media interviews and book tours in 2019. The last book, "The Jasenovac Lie Revealed" written by Vukić, prompted the Simon Wiesenthal Center to urge Croatian authorities to ban such works, noting that they "would immediately be banned in Germany and Austria and rightfully so". When asked if the society engaged in genocide denial, Vukić responded by saying "When it’s about genocide, it is often linked to Serbs. If it’s about that, we do deny it". Menachem Z. Rosensaft, the general counsel of the World Jewish Congress, condemned the affirmative column about Vukić's book written by Milan Ivkošić in the Večernji list, emphasizing that “there are horrific realities of history that must not be questioned, distorted or denied by anyone”.

=== Israel ===
Israel's government has repeatedly denied and justified the Gaza genocide. Genocide Watch asserts that Israel employs all twelve genocidal denialist tactics documented by Charny — including as falsely minimizing statistics on civilian deaths, attacking critics, denying intent, dehumanizing Palestinians, attributing casualties to mistakes or ancient enmity, invoking legalistic defenses, and blaming victims.

=== Japan ===
In Japan, interpretation of the Nanjing Massacre is reflected upon the notions of "pride, honor and shame". Takashi Yoshida describes the Japanese debate over the Nanjing Massacre as "crystalliz[ing] a much larger conflict over what should constitute the ideal perception of the nation: Japan, as a nation, acknowledges its past and apologizes for its wartime wrongdoings; or ... stands firm against foreign pressures and teaches Japanese youth about the benevolent and courageous martyrs who fought a just war to save Asia from Western aggression." In some nationalist circles in Japan, speaking of a large-scale massacre at Nanjing is regarded as "'Japan bashing' (in the case of foreigners) or 'self-flagellation' (in the case of Japanese)". This means that most Japanese youth are oblivious of the massacre because this dark history is not taught in Japanese schools, and the continued worship of Japanese war criminals enshrined in the Yasukuni Shrine by mainstream politicians in Japan.

=== Pakistan ===
The Government of Pakistan continues to deny that Bangladesh genocide took place during the Bangladesh Liberation War of 1971. They typically accuse Pakistani reporters (such as Anthony Mascarenhas), who reported on the genocide, of being "enemy agents". According to Donald W. Beachler, professor of political science at Ithaca College:

The government of Pakistan explicitly denied that there was genocide. By their refusal to characterise the mass-killings as genocide or to condemn and restrain the Pakistani government, the US and Chinese governments implied that they did not consider it so.

Similarly, in the wake of the 2013 Shahbag protests against war criminals who were complicit in the genocide, English journalist Philip Hensher wrote:

The genocide is still too little known about in the West. It is, moreover, the subject of shocking degrees of denial among partisan polemicists and manipulative historians.

=== Russia ===
Russia denies the Circassian genocide, instead describing the events as a mass migration (Russian: Черкесское мухаджирство, romanized: Cherkesskoye mukhadzhirstvo, lit. 'Circassian migrationism'. In 2009, the Presidential Commission of the Russian Federation to Counter Attempts to Falsify History to the Detriment of Russia’s Interests denied the genocide alongside other crimes.

=== Serbia ===
According to Sonja Biserko, president of the Helsinki Committee for Human Rights in Serbia, and Edina Becirevic, the faculty of criminology and security studies of the University of Sarajevo:

Denial of the Srebrenica genocide takes many forms [in Serbia]. The methods range from the brutal to the deceitful. Denial is present most strongly in political discourse, in the media, in the sphere of law, and in the educational system.

=== Turkey ===
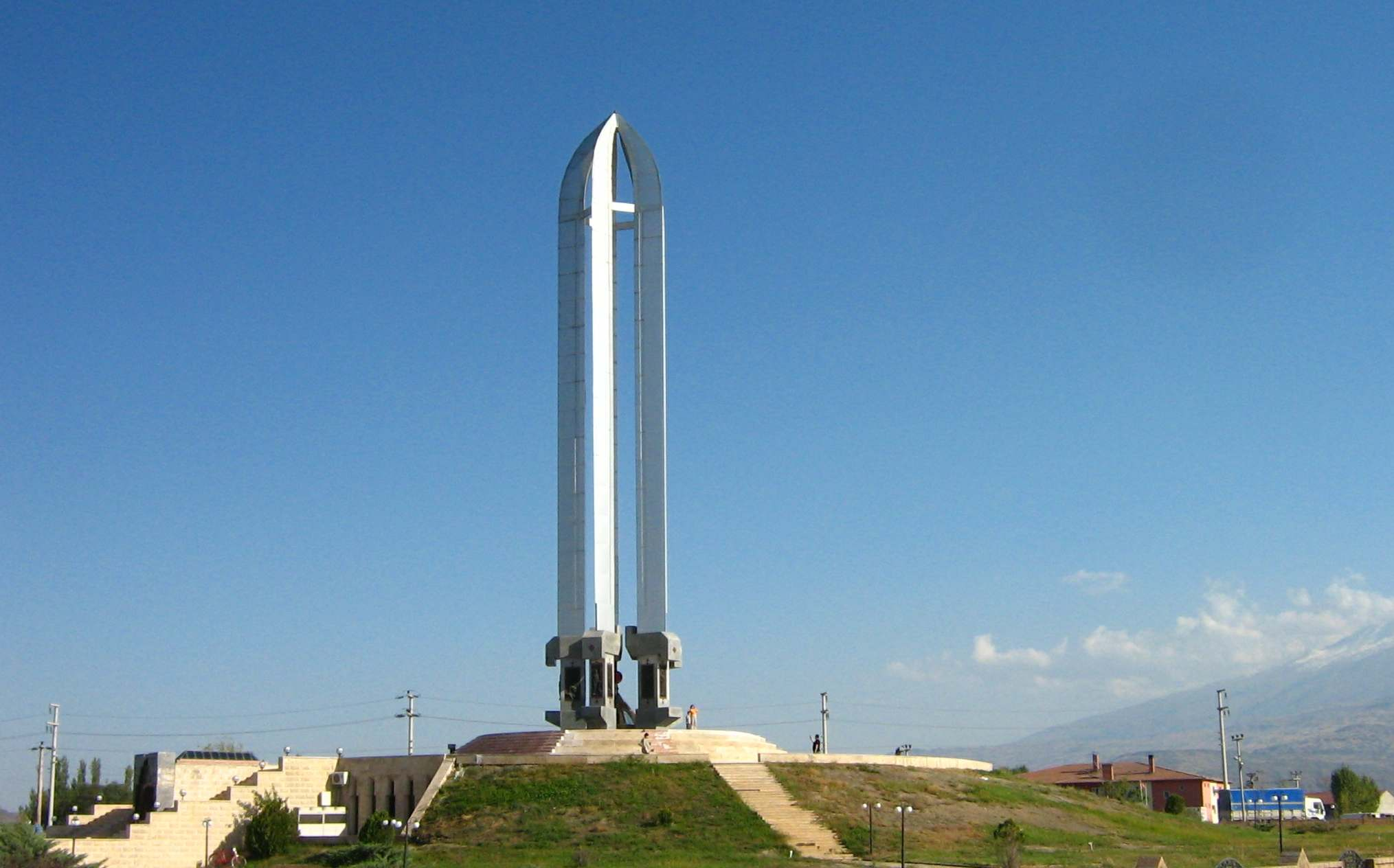
Iğdır Genocide Memorial and Museum

The Government of Turkey has long denied that the Armenian genocide was a genocide. According to historian Akçam, "Turkish denialism [of the genocide] is perhaps the most successful example of how the well-organised, deliberate, and systematic spreading of falsehoods can play an important role in the field of public debate" and that "fact-based truths have been discredited and relegated to the status of mere opinion". Turkey acknowledges that many Armenians residing in the former Ottoman Empire were killed in conflicts with Ottoman forces during World War I, but disputes that the killings were systematic and amounted to genocide. Measures recognising the Armenian genocide languished in the US Congress for decades despite condemnation by genocide scholars, and many US presidents refrained from labeling it such due to worries about souring relations with Turkey and intensive lobbying by Ankara. During the Darfur genocide, Recep Tayyip Erdogan claimed that there was no genocide taking place in Darfur as such a thing would be against Islam.

=== United States ===
The government of the United States has been accused of denial of the genocide of its Indigenous peoples by academics such as Benjamin Madley, David Stannard and Noam Chomsky.

== Law ==
The European Commission proposed a European Union–wide anti-racism law in 2001, which included an offence of genocide denial, but European Union states failed to agree on the balance between prohibiting racism and freedom of expression. After six years of debating, a watered down compromise was reached in 2007 which gave EU states freedom to implement the legislation as they saw fit.

In order to comply with and re-implement European criminal law, and also to respond to political calls to outlaw holocaust denial specifically, the Netherlands amended its criminal code to more explicitly outlaw insults by "denial, or far-reaching trivialising" and or "condoning" any of a list of international crimes, explicitly including genocide, in the criminal code, as long as these crimes were found irrevocably by a Dutch court or one to which the Kingdom of the Netherlands is a party.

In 2022, the United Nations Office on Genocide Prevention and the Responsibility to Protect issued a policy paper associating genocide denial with hate speech, specifically when directed to specific identifiable groups. The report gives policy recommendations for states and UN officials in the matter of denial.

== Effects ==
Genocide denial has an impact on both victim and perpetrator groups. Denial of a genocide affects relations between the victim and perpetrator groups or their respective countries, prevents personal victims of the genocide from seeking closure, and adversely affects political decisions on both sides. It can cause fear in the victims to express their cultural identity, retaliation from both parties, and hamper the democratic development of societies.

Effects on personal victims of the genocide

While confrontation of the committed atrocities can be a tough process in which the victim feels humiliated again by reliving the traumatic past, it still has a benign therapeutic effect, helping both victim and perpetrator groups to come to terms with the past. From a therapeutic point of view, letting the victim confront the past atrocity and its related painful memories is one way to reach a closure and to understand that the harm has occurred in the past. This also helps the memories to enter the shared narrative of the society, thereby becoming a common ground on which the society can make future decisions on, in political and cultural matters.

Denying recognition, in contrast, has a negative effect, further victimising the victim which will feel not only wronged by the perpetrator but also by being denied recognition of the occurred wrongdoing. Denial also has a pivotal role in shaping the norms of a society since the omission of any committed errors, and thereby the lack of condemnation and punishment of the committed wrongs, risks normalising similar actions, increasing the society's tolerance for future occurrences of similar errors.

According to sociologist Daniel Feierstein, the genocide perpetrator implements a process of transforming the identity of any survivors and erasing the memory of the existence of the victim group.

Societal effects of genocide denial

Bhargava notes that "[m]ost calls to forget disguise the attempt to prevent victims from publicly remembering in the fear that 'there is a dragon living on the patio and we better not provoke it.'" In other words, while societally "forgetting" an atrocity can on the surface be beneficial to the harmony of society, it further victimizes the target group for fear of future, similar action, and is directly detrimental to the sociocultural development of the victim group.

On the other hand, there are cases where "forgetting" atrocities is the most politically expedient or stable option. This is found in some states which have recently come out of minority rule, where the perpetrator group still controls most strategic resources and institutions, such as South Africa. This was, among others, one of the main reasons for granting amnesty in exchange for confessing to committed errors during the transitional period in South Africa. However, the society at large and the victims in particular will perceive this kind of trade-offs as "morally suspect," and may question its sustainability. Thus, a common refrain in regard to the Final Report (1998) by South Africa's Truth and Reconciliation Commission was "We've heard the truth. There is even talk about reconciliation. But where's the justice?"

Effects on democratic development

The denial has thereby a direct negative impact on the development of a society, often by undermining its laws and the issue of justice, but also the level of democracy itself. If democracy is meant to be built on the rule of law and justice, upheld and safeguarded by state institutions, then surely the omission of legal consequences and justice would potentially undermine the democracy. What is more dangerous from a historical point of view is that such a default would imply the subsequent loss of the meaning of these events to future generations, a loss which is resembled to "losing a moral compass." The society becomes susceptible to similar wrongdoings in the absence of proper handling of preceding occasions. Nonetheless, denial, especially immediately after the committed wrongdoings, is rather the rule than the exception and naturally almost exclusively done by the perpetrator to escape responsibility.

Implicit denial of genocide

While some societies or governments openly deny genocide, in some other cases, e.g. in the case of the "Comfort women" and the role of the Japanese State, the denial is more implicit. This was evident in how an overwhelmingly majority of the surviving victims refused to accept a monetary compensation since the Japanese government still refused to admit its own responsibility (the monetary compensation was paid through a private fund rather than by the state, a decision perceived by the victims about state's refusal to assume any direct responsibility). This can have the same effects on societies as outright denial. For example, atrocity denial and self-victimisation in Japanese historical textbooks has caused much diplomatic tension between Japan and neighbouring victim states, such as Korea and China, and bolstered domestic conservative or nationalist forces.

Turkey and Armenian genocide denial

The Turkish state's Armenian genocide denial has had far-reaching effects on the Turkish society throughout its history in regard to both ethnic minorities, especially the Kurds, but political opposition in general. The denial also affects Turks, in that there is a lack of recognition of Turks and Ottoman officials who attempted to stop the genocide. This lack of recognition of the various actors at play in Turkey could result in a rather homogeneous perception of the nation in question, thus making Armenians (but also third parties) project the perpetrating role onto the entire Turkish society and nation, causing further racial strife and aggravating the prospects of future reconciliation. For example, Armenian terrorist groups (e.g. ASALA and JCAG) committed terrorist acts during 1970's and 1980's as a direct result of the Turkish state denial of the genocide.

=== Prevention ===
Denial may be reduced by works of history, preservation of archives, documentation of records, investigation panels, search for missing persons, commemorations, official state apologies, development of truth commissions, educational programs, monuments, and museums. According to Johnathan Sisson, the society has the right to know the truth about historical events and facts, and the circumstances that led to massive or systematic human rights violations. He says that the state has the obligation to secure records and other evidence to prevent revisionist arguments. Genocide scholar Gregory Stanton suggests that prosecution can be a deterrent.

== See also ==
- Outline of genocide studies
- Damnatio memoriae
- DARVO – Deny, Attack, Reverse Victim & Offender
