= Gregory Stanton =

American academic and activist

Gregory H. Stanton
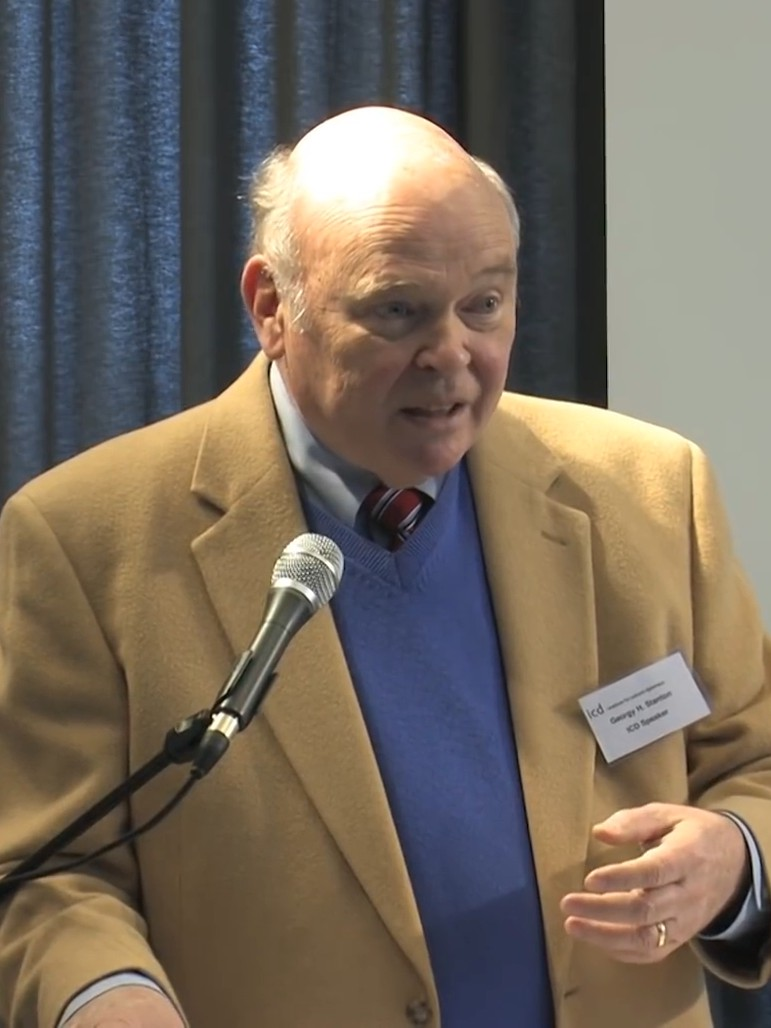
- Occupations: Jurist, academic, human rights activist
- Years active: 1980s–present
- Known for: founding Genocide Watch, work on the Khmer Rouge Tribunal and the ICTR
- Board member of: Founder and President of Genocide Watch; Chair of the Alliance Against Genocide; Former President of the International Association of Genocide Scholars
- Awards: W. Averell Harriman Award (1994); IAGS Distinguished Service Award (2013)

Academic background
- Education: Oberlin College; Harvard Divinity School; Yale Law School; University of Chicago (PhD)

Academic work
- Discipline: Genocide Studies, Cultural Anthropology, Law
- Institutions: George Mason University; University of Mary Washington; Washington and Lee University; American University; U.S. State Department
- Notable works: The Ten Stages of Genocide (1996)

Gregory H. Stanton is an American jurist, academic and human rights activist. He is best known for his work in the area of genocide studies.

Stanton is a former research professor in Genocide Studies and Prevention at the George Mason University in Fairfax County, Virginia, United States. He is the founder and president of Genocide Watch, the founder and director of the Cambodian Genocide Project, and the Chair of the Alliance Against Genocide. From 2007 to 2009 he was the president of the International Association of Genocide Scholars.

== Early life and academic background ==
Stanton comes from the lineage of women's suffrage activist Elizabeth Cady Stanton, and Henry Brewster Stanton, a notable Abolitionist. He worked as a voting rights worker in Mississippi, a Peace Corps Volunteer in the Ivory Coast, and as Church World Service/CARE Field Director in Cambodia in 1980.

Stanton was the research professor in Genocide Studies and Prevention at the School for Conflict Analysis and Resolution, George Mason University, Arlington, Virginia, until his retirement in 2019. From 2003 to 2009 he was the James Farmer Professor in Human Rights at the University of Mary Washington in Fredericksburg, Virginia. He has been a Law Professor at Washington and Lee University, American University, and the University of Swaziland. He has degrees from Oberlin College, Harvard Divinity School, Yale Law School, and a doctorate in cultural anthropology from the University of Chicago. He was a fellow at the Woodrow Wilson International Center for Scholars (2001–2002).

== Career ==
Stanton was a law professor at Washington and Lee University from 1985 to 1991, was a Fulbright Professor at the University of Swaziland, and was a professor of Justice, Law, and Society at the American University. From 2003 to 2009, he was the James Farmer Professor in Human Rights at the University of Mary Washington in Fredericksburg, Virginia.

Stanton founded the Cambodian Genocide Project at Yale in 1981 and since then has been a driving force to bring the Khmer Rouge to justice.

Stanton was the Chair of the American Bar Association Young Lawyer's Division Committee on Human Rights and a member of the A.B.A.'s Standing Committee on World Order Under Law. Stanton was a legal advisor to Rukh, the Ukrainian independence movement (1988–1992), work for which he was named the Ukrainian Congress Committee of America's 1992 Man of the Year.

Stanton served in the State Department (1992–1999). At the State Department he drafted the United Nations Security Council resolutions that created the International Criminal Tribunal for Rwanda, the Burundi Commission of Inquiry, and the Central African Arms Flow Commission. He also drafted the U.N. Peacekeeping Operations resolutions that helped bring about an end to the Mozambican civil war. In 1994, Stanton won the American Foreign Service Association's W. Averell Harriman Award for "extraordinary contributions to the practice of diplomacy exemplifying intellectual courage," based on his dissent from U.S. policy on the Rwandan genocide.

Stanton wrote the State Department options paper on ways to bring the Khmer Rouge to justice in Cambodia. Stanton was deeply involved in the U.N.-Cambodian government negotiations that brought about the creation of the Khmer Rouge Tribunal, for which he drafted internal rules of procedure.

Stanton is best known for his authorship of The Ten Stages of Genocide, a model of the genocidal process that the US State Department and UN have used in predicting and taking steps to prevent genocide. His Ten Stage model is used in courses on genocide in schools and colleges around the world.

In 1999 Stanton founded Genocide Watch. From 1999 to 2000, he also served as co-chair of the Washington Working Group for the International Criminal Court.

In 2004, Stanton published a proposal to establish an Office for Genocide Prevention at the UN. With other members of the International Campaign to End Genocide, he met with UN officials to lobby for the proposal. In 2004 in Stockholm, Secretary General Kofi Annan announced the creation of the Office of the UN Special Advisor for the Prevention of Genocide.

In 2007, Stanton was elected President of the International Association of Genocide Scholars, to serve until 2009. He served as First Vice President of the Association from 2005 to 2007. In 2013, the organization gave Stanton its Distinguished Service Award and made him a Life Member.

=== Rwanda ===
In 1989, after leading a genocide prevention training program for officials from Rwanda and surrounding countries, Stanton met with President Juvénal Habyarimana to ask him to remove ethnic identities from the Rwandan national identification cards because the ID cards could be used to identify people to be killed in a genocide. He advised President Habyarimana that if action were not taken to prevent it, Rwanda would have a genocide within five years.

=== Zimbabwe ===
In 2010, Stanton demanded that Robert Mugabe be prosecuted for the crime of genocide. He proposed a "Mixed UN-Zimbabwean Criminal Tribunal" inspired by the Khmer Rouge Tribunal, adding, "Mugabe's reign of terror must end."

In 2012, Stanton called for the United States to release "all diplomatic and intelligence cables relating to the Gukurahundi massacres" of Zimbabwe and to explain the U.S. decision "to remain silent", in order to "clear its conscience".

=== Gaza ===
In December 2024, Stanton and the rest of the "Gaza taskforce" at Genocide Watch determined that Israel is committing a genocide of the Palestinian people in Gaza. They argue that Israel's intentional bombardment of civilian infrastructure and starvation of civilians fulfills the Genocide Convention's definition of genocide, which includes "Killing members of the group" and "Deliberately inflicting on the group conditions of life calculated to bring about its physical destruction in whole or in part".

While they condemned Hamas as a "genocidal terrorist organization that must be defeated", they also said that this does not excuse "committing genocide" against Palestinians or "dehumanizing" them.

Stanton and the taskforce concluded that there should be an immediate ceasefire, release of all hostages, a surrender by Hamas, an end to Israel's blockade on Gaza, and global cooperation to diplomatically resolve the conflict.

=== Iran ===
Stanton has accused Iran – particularly Mahmoud Ahmadinejad – of incitement to genocide, explaining that the constant calls by the Iranian regime to destroy Israel directly advocate genocide. Stanton referenced speeches by Ahmadinejad calling for the destruction of Israel and advocating that Israeli Jews should be transferred to Germany and Austria. He described Iran's proposals as incitement to genocide and advocacy of forced population transfer. Stanton wrote:

Iran is the only country since Nazi Germany that has openly expressed its genocidal intent to wipe another nation off the map while pursuing a program to develop nuclear weapons. Few believed that Hitler was serious about his genocidal intentions until Nazis carried out the Holocaust. The Iranian President denies that the Holocaust even happened.

Stanton congratulated Angela Merkel for opposing Iran's nuclear program, and also praised Canada's Ministry of Foreign Affairs for recalling the Canadian Ambassador to Iran.

Stanton has condemned Iran's nuclear program, adding that NATO should protect Israel to safeguard the country from a possible nuclear missile strike.

=== Somaliland ===
In an article for the Mail and Guardian, Stanton acknowledged the Isaaq genocide that occurred in the Democratic Republic of Somalia under Siad Barre. He advocated for the recognition of Somaliland as a separate state from Somalia, arguing it could "help stave off conflict in a region that has suffered terribly."

== Genocide Watch ==
In 1999 Stanton founded Genocide Watch, a non-governmental organization campaigning against genocide based in Washington, D.C. Genocide Watch is the chair and coordinator of the Alliance Against Genocide, which includes 125 organizations in 31 countries, including the Minority Rights Group, the International Crisis Group, the Aegis Trust, and Survival International. Its board of advisers includes former commander of United Nations peacekeeping forces in Rwanda Roméo Dallaire, former Nuremberg Prosecutor Benjamin Ferencz, former US Ambassador to the United Nations and former Administrator of the U.S. Agency for International Development (USAID) Samantha Power, and former UN Special Advisers for the Prevention of Genocide Adama Dieng and Alice Nderitu.

Stanton has formed alliances with dozens of human rights leaders, such as Baroness Kennedy and Ewelina Ochab from the Coalition for Genocide Response. In 2020, Genocide Watch joined other human rights groups urging the U.N. Human Rights Council (UNHRC) to investigate the actions of the Chinese government regarding Uyghurs and other Turkic Muslim minorities in the Xinjiang region, and demand that China end persecution of Uyghurs that amount to acts of genocide. In the case of Bosco Ntaganda within the International Criminal Court investigation in the Democratic Republic of the Congo, Genocide Watch submitted amicus curiae observations along with the Antiquities Coalition and Blue Shield International, on the interpretation of attacks on cultural property in the Rome Statute.

Stanton has criticized the term "ethnic cleansing", calling it a term invented by Slobodan Milošević as a term used for the denial and cover-up of genocide, stating it whitewashes the crimes and impedes forceful action to stop genocide. He also rejects the "only intent" doctrine that the International Court of Justice used in Bosnia v Serbia and Croatia v Serbia to find that because Serbia's intent was "ethnic cleansing," Serbia's "sole" and "only" intent was not genocide, Serbia had not violated the Genocide Convention, writing:

The ICJ's doctrine of specific intent for genocide is so wrong that if you liken it to, for instance, intent in ordinary criminal law, it's like saying that if somebody picks up a gun, shoots and kills someone, they can't be charged with murder because they also had the intent to rob the person.

It's a fact that the intent of a state has to be even more complicated and more complex than the intention of an individual. No individual can possibly commit an act, almost any act, that only has one intention. So, this doctrine by the ICJ, I think, is fatally flawed.

== Publications ==
=== Articles ===
- The Ten Stages of Genocide
- Other Articles by Dr. Gregory Stanton
- QAnon is a Nazi Cult Rebranded, by Gregory Stanton
- The Double Genocide in Gaza, by Gregory Stanton
- Israel's Twelve Tactics of Denial, by Gregory Stanton
- Could the Rwandan Genocide Have Been Prevented? by Gregory Stanton
