= Auschwitz Institute for the Prevention of Genocide and Mass Atrocities =

U.S. nonprofit organization

The Auschwitz Institute for the Prevention of Genocide and Mass Atrocities (AIPG), formerly the Auschwitz Institute for Peace and Reconciliation, is a non-profit organization devoted to genocide and mass atrocity prevention. The institute is best known for its Raphael Lemkin Seminar for Genocide Prevention held annually at the Auschwitz concentration camp, and for serving as the technical secretariat of the Latin American Network for Genocide and Mass Atrocity Prevention.

AIPG is an NGO that provides technical assistance and training to governments, emphasizing a long term approach to genocide prevention. It was founded in 2006 by Fred Schwartz, and is directed from its beginnings by Dr. Tibi Galis. The organization has offices in New York City; in Buenos Aires, Argentina; in Kampala, Uganda; in Bucharest, Romania; and in Oswiecim, Poland. Its partner organizations include the United Nations Office on Genocide Prevention and the Responsibility to Protect and the Hague Institute for Global Justice.

== See also ==
- Genocide Watch
