= Genocide prevention =

Any act or actions that works toward averting future genocides

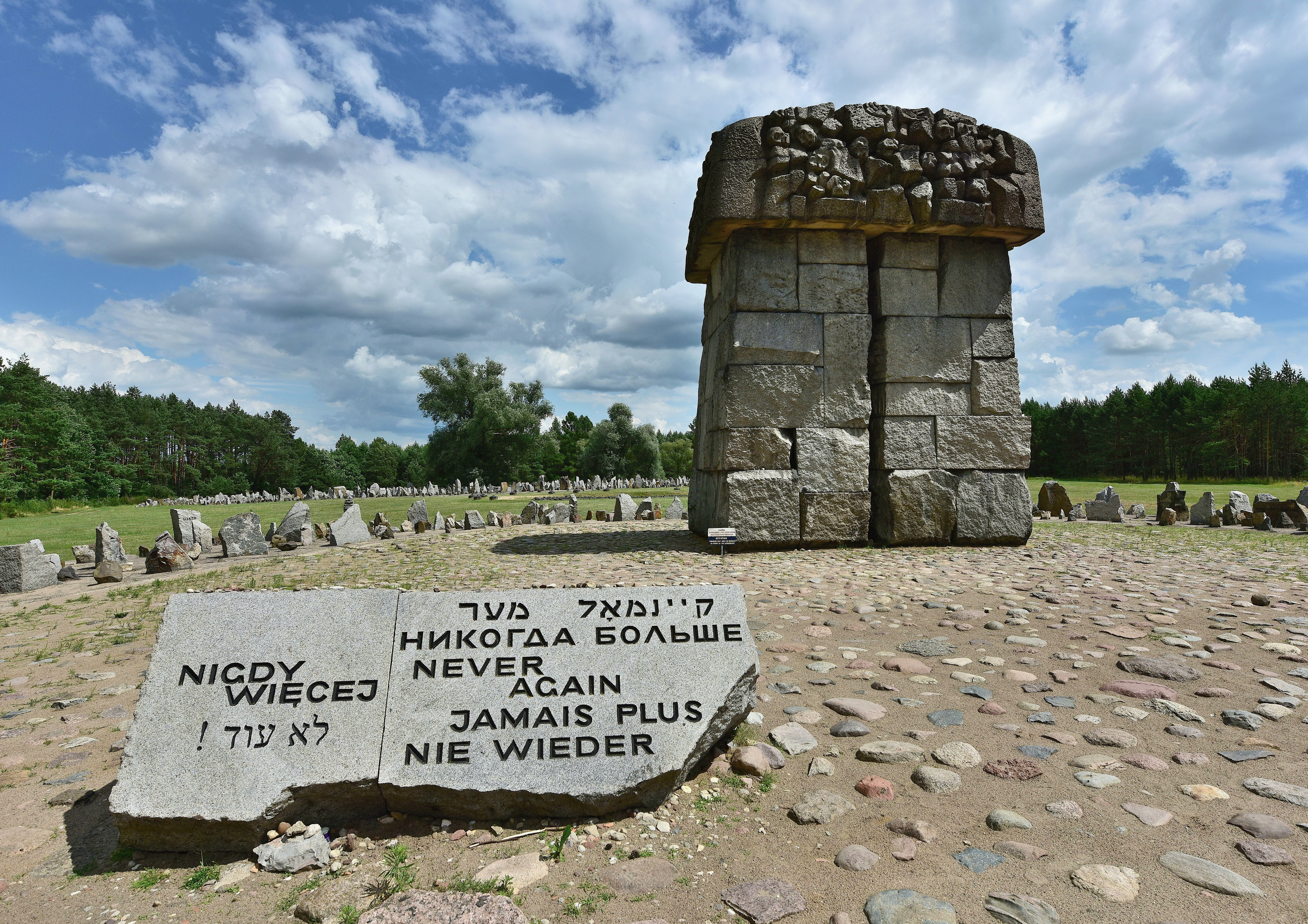
Multilingual "never again" memorial at Treblinka extermination camp

Prevention of genocide is any action that works toward averting future genocides. Genocides take a lot of planning, resources, and involved parties to carry out, they do not just happen instantaneously. Scholars in the field of genocide studies have identified a set of widely agreed upon risk factors that make a country or social group more at risk of carrying out a genocide, which include a wide range of political and cultural factors that create a context in which genocide is more likely, such as political upheaval or regime change, as well as psychological phenomena that can be manipulated and taken advantage of in large groups of people, like conformity and cognitive dissonance. Genocide prevention depends heavily on the knowledge and surveillance of these risk factors, as well as the identification of early warning signs of genocide beginning to occur.

One of the main goals of the United Nations with the passage of the Genocide Convention after the Second World War and the Holocaust is to prevent future genocide from taking place. The Genocide Convention and the responsibility to protect provide the basis for the responsibility of every UN member state to actively prevent genocide and act to stop it in other states when it occurs. However, the United Nations has been heavily criticized for its failure to prevent genocide, especially in the latter half of the twentieth century.

Intervention in genocide can occur at many different stages of the progression of a genocide, but the most ideal stage to intervene is before genocide occurs at all, in the form of prevention known as upstream prevention. Preventing genocide in this way requires a constant and thorough assessment of the risk of genocide around the world at any given time, given the known risk factors, early warning signs, and the knowledge of how a genocide progresses.

== The psychological basis of genocide ==
Genocide is not something that only trained, sadistic killers take part in, but rather it is something that ordinary people can do with the proper "training" via cognitive restructuring and social conditioning. The act of killing for genocidal purposes is not a distinct category of human behavior. Instead, genocidal killing demonstrates the potential of ordinary psychological and social processes to be manipulated until they escalate into violence, under certain conditions. One of the major puzzles in studying both the occurrence of and prevention of genocide, therefore, is understanding what makes those "normal" cognitive processes, both on the individual and collective levels, vulnerable to manipulation by outsiders, and which social and political conditions provide a breeding ground for that manipulation to turn violent.

On the individual level, the psychological concept of cognitive dissonance plays a large role in a person's transformation from peaceful citizen to violent genocidal killer. Even more specifically, Alexander Hinton, in his 1996 study on the psycho-social factors that contributed to the Cambodian genocide, coined the term "psychosocial dissonance" to add to this well-known psychological concept other anthropological concepts like cultural models and notions of the self. These forms of dissonance, both cognitive and psychosocial, arise when a person is confronted with behavioral expectations that conflict with their own identity or concept of self, and subsequently work subconsciously to resolve those inconsistencies. Hinton claims that there are a number of cognitive "moves" that must occur in order for a person to reduce psychosocial dissonance felt at the onset of genocide, and these moves slowly transform people into their "genocidal selves". These cognitive moves include the dehumanization of victims, the employment of euphemisms to mask violent deeds, the undergoing of moral restructuring, becoming acclimated to the act of killing, and/or denying responsibility for violent actions. The first move, dehumanization, is one of the biggest "steps", as it has been central to every genocide. In the Holocaust, the Cambodian genocide, and the Rwandan genocide, as particularly notable examples, victims were labeled as vermin, cockroaches, rats, or snakes, to separate them entirely from the category of human in this process of dehumanization. When the label of "person" is taken away from entire groups of individuals, acting violently towards them, including murdering them, becomes much easier for the average person.

=== Social psychological factors ===
In addition to individual-level cognitive "moves", there are also many social psychological factors that influence an "ordinary" group's transformation into killers. First, the concept of social cognition explains the ways in which people think about themselves and those around them. People's social cognition is divided into thinking about others as belonging to in-groups and out-groups, which are defined by collective identity and social bonds. Everyone has a bias for their own group called an In-group bias, but this bias only has negative consequences when people simultaneously hold both extremely positive views of themselves and their in-group and extremely negative views of out-groups. People are also generally socialized to avoid conflict and aggression with other members of their own in-group, so one way of overcoming that barrier to violence is to redefine who belongs to each group so that victims of genocide become excluded from the in-group and are no longer protected by this in-group bias.

Social influence and social relations also constitute factors vulnerable to manipulation. Many cultures actively encourage conformity, compliance, and obedience in social relations and can have severe social "penalties" for those that do not adhere to the norms, so that group members can feel an intense pressure to engage in violence if other members are also engaging in it. This tendency for people to conform can be manipulated to induce "thoughtless behavior" in large groups of people at once. Research also shows that this pressure to conform, also known as the "conformity effect", increases when there is an authority figure present in the group, and when certain social and institutional contexts increase people's tendency to conform, like the loss of stability, as people tend to adapt to what is expected of them when stability disappears. Other tendencies of human social relationships can similarly push people towards violence, such as prejudice, altruism, and aggression. It is particularly relevant to understand the link between prejudice and violence, as prejudice is often one of the first starting points in the formation of genocidal behavior. The scapegoat theory (or practice of scapegoating) helps to explain the relationship, as it posits that people have a tendency to lash out on out-groups when they are frustrated, for example in times of political or economic crisis.

== Risk factors for genocide ==
There are a variety of political and cultural factors that make states more at risk for movement down a path of mass violence, and an understanding and recognition of the existence of those factors can be crucial in genocide prevention efforts. While studies in this area find varying degrees of risk for each particular factor, there is widespread consensus on which kinds of environments present the greatest risk for the occurrence of genocide. First, certain situational factors like destabilizing crises and political upheaval make countries more vulnerable to genocide. Forms of political upheaval include civil wars, assassinations, revolutions, coups, defeat in international war, anticolonial rebellions, or any sort of upheaval that results in unconventional regime change or in elites with extremist ideologies coming to power. Almost all genocides of the past half-century have occurred either during or in the immediate aftermath of one of these types of political upheaval.

Political upheaval is particularly dangerous when a repressive leader is able to come to power. Authoritarian leaders can propel entire societies into "monolithic cultures" at risk for genocide by incentivizing a strong obedience to the state, a lack of tolerance for diversity, and creating an environment that facilitates Groupthink and conformity. The most dangerous authoritarian leaders often have extremist views about a new society "purified" of unwanted or threatening groups of people, and they promote these ideologies as moral and for the "greater good" of the nation, as they classify certain threatening groups as barriers to national success. Many such leaders in past genocides, like Adolf Hitler, Pol Pot, and Slobodan Milošević, have also shared similar personal characteristics, as charismatic, self-confident, intelligent individuals with a fierce desire for power.

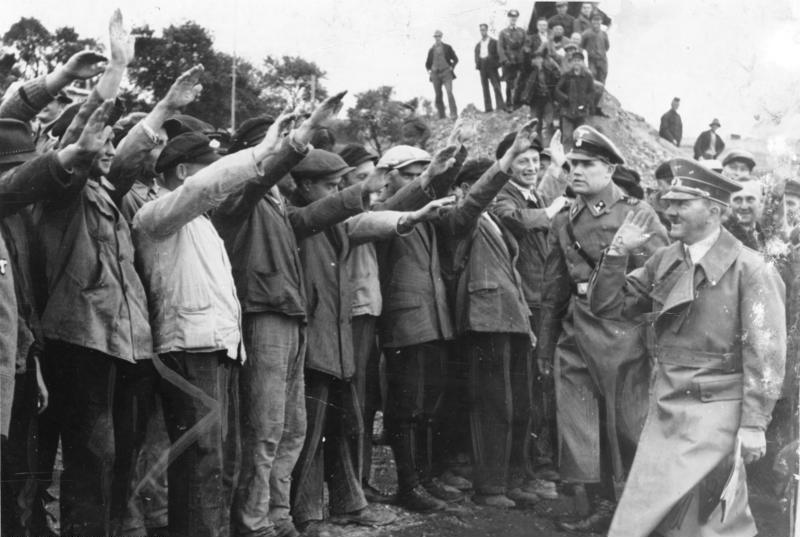
Adolf Hitler is saluted by German troops in an enthusiastic demonstration.

In addition to situational political factors like upheaval, authoritarian leaders, and unstable government structures, certain cultural factors also contribute to the likelihood that a state will commit genocide. Cultures that promote the use of aggression as a normative problem-solving skill, and cultures that glorify violence through things like military parades, for example, have a greater risk of perpetrating mass violence. Similarly, societies with a strong history of supremacy ideologies, including the long-term normalization of biases towards outsiders, a lack of acceptance of cultural diversity, and the exclusion of certain groups from society, are also at greater risk. Specifically, Barbara Harff's 2003 model on the antecedents to genocide found that countries with an elite ideology, in which the ruling elite hold an exclusionary vision for the society, are two and half times more likely to commit genocide in the aftermath of a state failure, and genocide is also more than two times as likely in states where the political elite constitutes an ethnic minority. Many versions of these types of extreme ideologies are present in historical examples of genocide, including the "purification" efforts of the Khmer Rouge in Cambodia, and Nazi Germany's pursuit of an exclusively Aryan race in their nation.

Additionally, the potential for genocidal violence increases when multiple forms of crisis, upheaval, or destabilization occur simultaneously, or when the effects of past crises remain unresolved.

== Early warning signs of genocide ==
Gregory Stanton, the founding president of Genocide Watch, formulated a well-known list of ten (originally eight) stages of genocide in 1996. These stages do not necessarily occur linearly or exclusively one at a time, but they provide a guiding model to analyze the processes leading to genocide that can be recognized as warning signs and acted upon, as each stage presents an opportunity for certain prevention measures. Stanton's ten stages include: classification, symbolization, discrimination, dehumanization, organization, polarization, preparation, persecution, extermination, and denial. The first few of these stages happen early in the process of inciting genocide, and thus offer the most opportunity for preventative measures before genocide is already in full force.

- During the Classification stage, where people begin distinguishing within a culture between "us and them" designated by race, ethnicity, religion, or nationality, the most important prevention measure is to promote tolerance and understanding, and to promote the widespread use of classifications and common ground that transcend these harmful divisions.
- In the Symbolization stage, in which "other" groups are given names or physical symbols to demonstrate their classification, hate symbols, hate speech, and group marking may be outlawed. But such prohibitions are only effective if they are supported by cultural acceptance and social practice.
- Once a society progresses to the Discrimination stage, where the dominant group, acting on an exclusionary ideology, uses law and political power to deny the rights of the targeted group, the most crucial preventative measure is to ensure full rights and political empowerment for all groups in a society.
- The final "early" step, before a society actually begins to organize to carry out the genocide, is Dehumanization, in which one group denies the humanity of the other group. Stanton argues that prevention at this stage should be aimed at ensuring that incitement to genocide is not confused with protected speech, that hate propaganda is actively countered or banned, and that hate crimes or atrocities are promptly punished. Dehumanization is widely recognized by Stanton and other scholars as a key stage in the genocidal process. Dehumanization is the denial of a group's humanity. It places a group's members "outside the universe of moral obligation". It is a fatal early warning sign because it overcomes the universal human revulsion against murder. According to Stanton, dehumanization is the "phase where the death spiral of genocide begins".

For genocide to occur, these underlying cultural stages in the genocidal process must be accompanied by six other stages. Several may occur simultaneously. Each "stage" is itself a process.

- "Organization" of hate groups, militias, and armies is necessary because genocide is a group crime; prevention concentrates on outlawing hate groups and prosecuting hate crimes;
- "Polarization" of the population, so that genocide becomes popularly supported, is necessary to empower the perpetrators. It often means driving out, arresting, or killing moderates who might oppose genocide from within the perpetrator group; prevention requires physical and legal protection of moderates from arrest and detention;
- "Preparation" – planning of the genocide by leaders of the killers – usually occurs secretly; prevention is best achieved by arresting leaders who incite or conspire to commit genocide, imposing sanctions on them, and supporting resistance to them;
- "Persecution" of the victim group through massive violation of their fundamental human rights means genocidal massacres may follow; prevention requires targeted sanctions on leaders of regimes that commit crimes against humanity, including prosecution in international and national courts, diplomatic pressure, economic sanctions, and preparation for regional intervention.
- "Extermination" is the stage in the genocidal process that international law officially recognizes as "genocide". However, mass killing is not the only act recognized as genocide in the Genocide Convention. Causing severe bodily or mental harm to members of the group, deliberately inflicting conditions of life intended to physically destroy the group, imposing measures intended to prevent births within the group, and forcibly transferring children of the group to another group are also acts of genocide outlawed by the Genocide Convention. At this stage targeted sanctions and credible diplomatic threats may reduce a genocide. But support for internal resistance and acceptance of refugees is also usually required. Stopping genocide against the will of national leaders normally requires their overthrow from within, or armed intervention under Chapter 7 of the UN Charter or by regional organizations acting under UN Charter Chapter 8.
- Every genocide begins and ends in Denial by the perpetrators and their successors. Denial is best countered by ample reporting of facts during a genocide by journalists, other media, human rights organizations, UN Commissions of Inquiry, and world leaders. After a genocide, denial may be countered by trials of the perpetrators, truth commissions, educational programs, memorials, museums, films and other media.

These early warning signs are common in nearly every genocide, but their identification is only useful in prevention efforts when actual actions are taken to combat them. One salient example of a failure to act on early warning signs is the Rwandan genocide. Despite numerous warnings, both indirect and explicit, there was widespread failure on the part of individual nations like the United States and international organizations like the United Nations to take the necessary preventative steps before the genocide was already well underway. According to Stanton, the facts about the massacres were heavily resisted; the US and UK refused to invoke the term "genocide" in order to avoid their duty to act, instead naming it a civil war; "group-think" concluded that stopping the genocide would endanger the lives of UNAMIR peacekeeping troops and exceed their mandate [the UNAMIR commander requested reinforcements, but was rebuffed]; although thousands of US marines were on ships off the coast of East Africa, US policy makers feared intervention into a "quagmire" like Somalia; and black Rwandan lives did not matter compared to the risk of the lives of Americans, Europeans, and troops from other UN member states. The US Secretary of State did not call the mass killings a genocide until June 10, 1994, after most of the killing was already over, and the press and human rights groups also failed to name the crime for what it was until two weeks into the genocide.

== Role of the United Nations ==
=== Convention on the Prevention and Punishment of the Crime of Genocide ===
The 1948 Convention on the Prevention and Punishment of the Crime of Genocide (also known as the "Genocide Convention") is the principal guiding international legal document for genocide prevention efforts, along with Chapter VII of the United Nations Charter. In the aftermath of World War II and the atrocities of the Holocaust, the ratification of the Genocide Convention signaled the international community's commitment to the principle of "never again" in terms of its prioritization of genocide prevention.

Reaffirming its full support for the mandate of the Special Adviser to the Secretary-

General on the Prevention of Genocide, who acts as, inter alia, an early warning mechanism to prevent potential situations that could result in genocide,

=== International criminal tribunals ===
In 1993 and 1994, the United Nations Security Council established two ad-hoc international courts, the International Criminal Tribunal for the former Yugoslavia and the International Criminal Tribunal for Rwanda in order to try those indicted for genocide, crimes against humanity, and war crimes in the Bosnian and Rwandan genocides. Then, in 1998, the Rome Statute of the International Criminal Court was adopted, giving the International Criminal Court (ICC) jurisdiction for the crime of genocide, crimes against humanity, and war crimes.

=== Responsibility to protect ===
Advocates of the responsibility to protect have asserted that nation states that fail to fulfill their essential purpose to protect their people against genocide and other crimes against humanity lose their legitimate right to claim sovereignty. In such circumstances, the United Nations, regional organizations, and other transnational institutions have a responsibility to protect people in nations that violate fundamental human rights. This international declaration was adopted by consensus at the 2005 United Nations World Summit. It turns the concept of sovereignty right side up, asserting that sovereignty comes from the people of a nation, not from its rulers. This means that state sovereignty should be transcended for the protection of a population if the government of a nation state is unable or unwilling to do so, or worse, if the government itself is committing genocide or crimes against its own people. This norm has provided justification for the U.N., regional organizations, and other transnational institutions to intervene even against the will of national governments for the prevention of genocide. However, some critics of the responsibility to protect claim that the doctrine will be abused as an excuse to invade or bring about regime changes.

=== Criticisms of the United Nations on genocide prevention and intervention ===
The United Nations has been widely criticized for acting inadequately, too slowly, or not at all in cases of genocide. Since its establishment in 1948, the UN's success rate at preventing genocide has been very low, as evidenced by the large number of mass atrocities that have occurred in the past half-century that might fall under the UN definition of genocide, but the fact that only a few cases have been legally established as constituting genocide and prosecuted as such. The UN faces a number of challenges in acting to prevent and intervene in cases of genocide. First, the fact that individual member states compose both the UN General Assembly and the UN Security Council means that humanitarian goals become secondary to national political goals and pressures, as member states pursue their own interests. Vetoes or threats of vetoes by one of the Permanent Five members of the UN Security Council have often paralyzed the UN Security Council. For example, the United States and the Soviet Union virtually prevented the United Nations from approving humanitarian interventions in any areas they deemed to be of strategic significance during the Cold War. An exception was the Korean War when the Uniting for Peace Resolution, United Nations General Assembly Resolution 377, passed during a Soviet walk-out from the Security Council, allowed the UN General Assembly to authorize the use of force. Uniting for Peace has been used thirteen times by the General Assembly, but it is now avoided by all of the five permanent members of the Security Council because in the General Assembly they lack any veto power. Additionally, despite the responsibility to protect, many states still argue in favor of the protection of state sovereignty over intervention, even in the face of potential mass killing. Another significant barrier to action on genocidal violence is the reticence to officially invoke the term "genocide", as it appears to be applied narrowly over the objections of lawyers and governments that want to avoid action, and much too slowly in cases of mass atrocities. Instead euphemisms such as "ethnic cleansing" are substituted, even though there are no international treaties prohibiting "ethnic cleansing".

== Types of prevention ==
=== Upstream prevention ===
Upstream prevention, is taking preemptive measures before a genocide occurs to prevent one from occurring. The focus in upstream prevention is determining which countries are at most risk. This is mainly done using risk assessments which are quite accurate predictors. Scholars in the field have developed numerous models, each looking at different factors. Stanton's process model of genocide has been one of the most successful in predicting genocides. A statistical model that has also proved accurate comes from Barbara Harff. Her model uses factors such as political upheaval, prior genocides, authoritarian government, exclusionary ideologies, closure of borders, and systematic violations of human rights, among others. These assessments are used by genocide prevention NGOs, the UN, World Bank, and other international institutions, and by governments around the world.

=== Mid-stream prevention ===
Mid-stream prevention takes place when a genocide is already taking place. The main focus of mid-stream prevention is to end the genocide before it progresses further, taking more lives. This type of prevention often involves military intervention of some sort. Intervention is often very expensive, and may have unintended consequences. Scholars tend to disagree on the effectiveness of military intervention. Some claim that military intervention promotes rebel groups or that it is too expensive for the lives it saves. Scholars tend to prefer upstream prevention because it saves lives and does not require costly intervention.

=== Downstream prevention ===
Downstream prevention takes place after a genocide has ended. Its focus is on preventing another genocide in the future. Re-building and restoring the community is the goal. Justice for the victims plays a major role in repairing communities to prevent a future genocide from occurring. This justice can take various forms with trials being a common form, like the Nuremberg trials, trials by the ICTY, ICTR, Sierra Leone, Cambodian and other international tribunals, and trials in national courts following the fall of genocidal regimes. Justice and healing of the community is always imperfect. Some scholars criticize the imperfections, especially those of trials. Common criticisms of trials are their retro-activity, selectivity, and politicization. However, when no justice is done and no one is punished for perpetrating genocide, Harff has shown statistically that such impunity increases the risk of future genocide and crimes against humanity in the same society by over three times.

== Genocide prevention and public health ==
While the prevention of genocide is typically approached from a political or national defense angle, the field of public health can also make significant contributions to this effort. Genocide, along with other forms of mass atrocity, is inherently an issue of public health, as it has a significant and detrimental impact on population health, both immediately after the violence occurs and also in the long-term health of a post-genocidal population. With regards to the mortality numbers alone, genocide has killed more people than war-related deaths in every historical period. And it also far surpasses the mortality rates of some of the most pressing epidemiological threats. In 1994, the year that the Rwandan genocide occurred, the mortality rate from the genocide itself was 20 times higher than the rate of HIV/AIDS deaths and more than 70 times higher than the rate of malaria-related deaths, despite the fact that Rwanda was geographically sandwiched by these two pandemics. And in the long run, the public health impact of genocide goes beyond the number of people killed. During genocide, healthcare facilities are often destroyed, doctors and nurses are killed in the violence, and the usual disease prevention efforts of the nation are disrupted, for example, immunization programs, which normally save thousands of lives. The destruction of these facilities and healthcare programs has longterm effects. Additionally, post-genocidal societies have an increased rate of chronic and acute disease, low birth rates, increased perinatal mortality, and increased malnutrition. The individual-level health of genocide survivors also suffers in the long-term, given that significant trauma has both long-lasting psychological and physical effects.

The American Medical Association (AMA) recognizes this critical link between health and human rights in the area of genocide and its prevention, and urges physicians to approach genocide using public health strategies. Such strategies include documentation of genocide and pre-genocidal conditions through case reports and surveillance, epidemiological studies to assess the impact of genocide on public health, education and spreading awareness about the understanding of genocide and its psychological precursors to the public, to other health professionals, and to policymakers, and advocacy for policies and programs aimed at the prevention of genocide.

== Ongoing prevention efforts ==
=== Genocide Watch ===
Genocide Watch was the first international organization dedicated solely to the prevention of genocide. Founded at the Hague Appeal for Peace in May 1999 by Dr. Gregory Stanton, Genocide Watch coordinates the Alliance Against Genocide. Genocide Watch utilizes Stanton's Ten Stages of Genocide to analyze events that are early warning signs of genocide. It sponsors a website on genocide prevention. It issues genocide alerts about genocidal situations that it sends to public policy makers and recommends preventive actions.

=== The Alliance Against Genocide ===
The Alliance Against Genocide was also founded by Gregory Stanton at the Hague Appeal for Peace in 1999 and was originally named The International Campaign to End Genocide. It was the first international coalition dedicated to the prevention of genocide. The Alliance includes over 70 international and national non-governmental anti-genocide organizations in 31 countries. The organizations include: 21 Wilberforce Initiative, Act for Sudan, Aegis Trust, Antiquities Coalition, Armenian National Committee, Brandeis Center, Burma Human Rights Network, Darfur Women Action Group, Cardozo Law Institute, CALDH, Cambodian Genocide Project, Center for Political Beauty, Combat Genocide Association, Christian Solidarity International, Documentation Center of Cambodia, EMMA, Fortify Rights, Free Rohingya Coalition, Genocide Watch, Hammurabi, Hudo, Human Security Centre, In Defense of Christians, INTERSOCIETY, International Alert, International Committee on Nigeria, International Crisis Group, Institute for Cultural Diplomacy, Institute for the Study of Genocide, Jewish World Watch, Johannesburg Holocaust and Genocide Center, Jubilee Campaign, Matabeleland Institute for Human Rights, Mediators Beyond Borders, Knights of Columbus, Minority Rights Group International, Montreal Institute for Human Rights Studies, Never Again Association, North Korea Freedom Coalition, Operation Broken Silence, PROOF, Protection Approaches, Sentinel Project, Shlomo, STAND, Stimson Center, Survival International, TRIAL, Waging Peace, WARM, World Outside My Shoes, and World Without Genocide.

=== United Nations Office on Genocide Prevention and the Responsibility to Protect ===
The Office on Genocide Prevention and the Responsibility to Protect (OGPRP) supports two Special Advisers in conducting training for national governments on policies to prevent genocide, and advising the UN's Secretary-General and the UN on genocide prevention and early warning.

OGPRP was originally proposed by Gregory Stanton in 2000 and advocated at the UN by Stanton and Bernard Hamilton of the Leo Kuper Foundation, and by the Minority Rights Group and other member organizations in the Alliance Against Genocide.

UN Secretary-General Kofi Annan (with key advisors like Edward Mortimer and Assistant Secretary-General Danilo Turk) created the office in 2004 to be led by a single Special Advisor. Annan's successor Ban Ki-moon expanded this to its current dual configuration.

The Special Adviser of the Secretary-General for the Prevention of Genocide, and its Office of the Special Adviser on the Prevention of Genocide (OSAPG), issues public warnings about situations at risk of genocide. Chaloka Beyani is the current Special Adviser of the Secretary-General for the Prevention of Genocide.

Mô Bleeker is the current Special Adviser on the Responsibility to Protect (R2P). The R2P Special Adviser role was added to OGPRP in 2007, with the first appointed in 2008.

In 2014, led by Special Advisers Adama Dieng and Jennifer Welsh, the OGPRP released the Framework of Analysis for Atrocity Crimes, a document that identifies some of the main risk factors for genocide and other atrocity crimes.

=== Early warning project ===
The Early Warning Project is an early warning tool developed by United States Holocaust Memorial Museum and Dartmouth College. The Early Warning Project aids US policy makers by determining which states are the most likely to experience a genocide. From this, preventive steps can be taken concerning states that pose a risk of genocide.

=== Genocide task force ===
The Genocide Task Force was created in 2007, with the purpose of developing a US strategy to prevent and stop future genocides. The task force was co chaired by former US Secretary of State Madeleine K. Albright, and former US Secretary of Defense William S. Cohen. In 2008 the Genocide Task Force came out with a report for US policy makers on the prevention of genocide. This report claimed that a well rounded "comprehensive strategy" would be required to prevent genocide. This strategy would need to include early warning systems, preventive action before a crisis, preparation for military intervention, strengthening of international institutions and norms, and a willingness for world leaders to take decisive action. While the report states that military intervention should remain an available option, upstream preventive measures should be the focus of the United States and the international community. The task force's report resulted in creation of the Atrocities Prevention Board, a US interagency effort to assess risks of genocide and other atrocity crimes.

== See also ==
- Countering violent extremism
- Deradicalization
- Genocide education
- Incitement to ethnic or racial hatred
- Outline of genocide studies
- Ten stages of genocide
