= Kafanchan Peace Declaration =

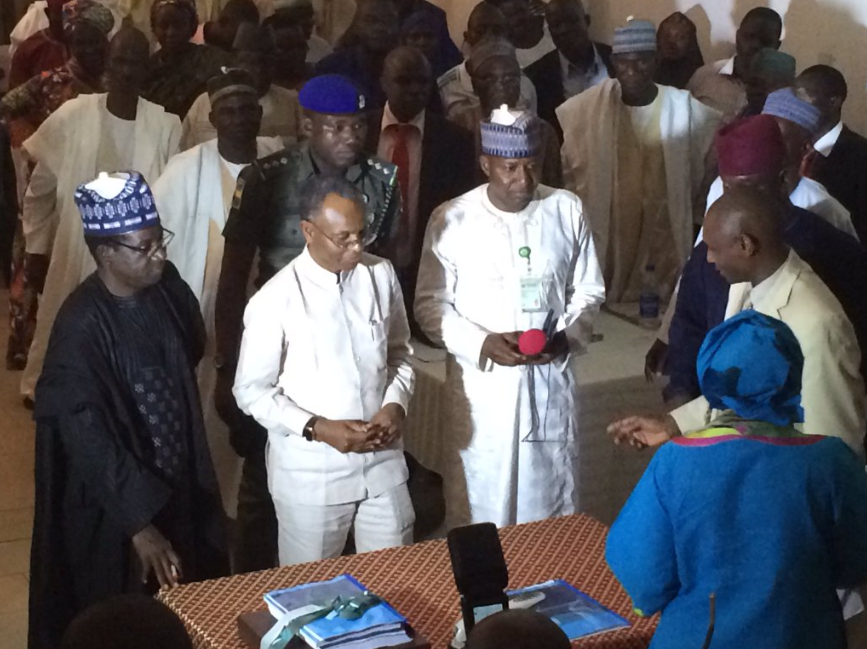
Governor of Kaduna State, Nasir El-Rufai and Governor of Plateau State, Simon Lalong sign the Kafanchan Peace Declaration as official observers on March 23rd 2016 in Kafanchan, Kaduna State, Nigeria as Alice Wairimu Nderitu the lead mediator looks on.

The Kafanchan Peace Declaration is a peace accord signed by five local government areas in southern Kaduna State, Nigeria. The local government areas involved in the process were the Sanga, Kachia, Kaura, Zangon Kataf and Jema'a. The five areas include 29 ethnic communities headed by 32 chairs. The declaration has been signed on 23 March 2016 in Kafanchan, Kaduna State, Nigeria. The peace accord has been facilitated by the Swiss-based organization Centre for Humanitarian Dialogue (HD) with Alice Wairimu Nderitu as the lead mediator. https://www.peaceagreements.org/agreements/1922/ This was the first time in Nigeria that a woman was playing the role of peace mediator in an inter-communal armed conflict.

== Background ==
Communities from Southern Kaduna, including the Sanga, Kachia, Kaura, Zangon Kataf and Jema'a, have suffered from violent conflict in the past. Many ethnic communities from southern Kaduna State have been in conflict with each other in the past. These conflicts arose due to tension regarding settling differences, clashes between farmers and grazers, the resettlement of internally displaced people and many other issues. Sporadic armed conflicts erupted due to deep hatred between ethnic and religious groups in some parts of southern Kaduna.

== Participants ==
Among the participants of the inter-communal dialogue were community leaders, youth, women, religious leaders, elders and cultural associations.

Special observers to the signing ceremony included the Canadian Ambassador to Nigeria, the Norwegian Ambassador to Nigeria, the Governor of Kaduna State, Nasir Ahmad el-Rufai, the Governor of Plateau State, Simon Bako Lalong, the Attorney General and Commissioner for Justice of Kaduna state, Mrs. Amina Dyeris Asijuwade, the Chief of Staff of Kaduna State, Hajiya Hadiza Bala Usman and traditional rulers in Southern Kaduna.

== Agreement and implementation ==
The Kafanchan Peace Declaration is the culmination of the Southern Kaduna State Inter-Communal Dialogue, which started in 2015 at the initiative of the Centre for Humanitarian Dialogue (HD). It is a commitment to non-violent conflict resolution by communities from five local government areas in southern Kaduna State.

The purpose of the declaration is to break down the obstacles to peaceful coexistence among the communities in southern Kaduna State. All parties agree that the divisions between and within communities are caused by an institutional structure which polarizes the groups along ethnic and religious lines. These divisions can be overcome by dialogue and long term intervention in order to reduce violence based on prejudice, biases and stereotypes.

The Declaration asks the signatories to nurture a peaceful coexistence among Kaduna’s communities by launching political and social goals as well as a timeline for action. A conflict prevention plan, incorporating all stakeholders, will aim to put in place a tension management mechanism that would allow the communities to prevent future conflict.

It called on the Nigerian government to improve the infrastructure in the existing grazing reserves and reactivate the farmers marketing boards to support the needs of the farmers. It also encourages the government to increase security measures in girls' schools to protect female students from abduction, harm and violence.

== Results ==
The Kaduna State Government welcomed the Kafanchan Peace Declaration and congratulated the five communities and its leaders for choosing dialogue over conflict.

== Signatories ==
The declaration was signed by the following communities in the local government areas of:

- Sanga: Ayu, Fulani, Gwandara, Hausa, Mada, Nandu, Ninzo and Numana.
- Kachia: Adara, Bajju, Fulani, Hausa, Ikulu, Jaba and Kuturmi.
- Kaura: Fulani, Hausa, Igbo, Kagoro, Sholio and Takad.
- Zangon Kataf: Atyap, Bajju, Fulani, Hausa, Ikulu, Kamantan and Yoruba.
- Jema'a: Bajju, Fantswam, Fulani, Gwong, Hausa, Kaninkon, Igbo.
