= International Policy Statement =

The International Policy Statement of Canada is a policy statement, released on April 19, 2005, declaring Canada's intentions, attitudes, and plans to increase its global engagement in international security and foreign relations. Specifically, Canada's International Policy Statement focuses on diplomacy, development, defence, and commerce. According to the statement, Canada's defensive involvement will increase interaction with; rising global powers, fragile and failed states, putting emphasis on protection. The section on Canadian defence also includes combating the threat of global terrorism, renewing attention to peace operations, and expanding the defence of North America. The International Policy Statement's main development goal focuses on global poverty reduction. The commerce section outlines Canada's efforts to become a more active member of the global economy and the plan to cut and eventually cancel the national debt. Canada's interest in becoming a bigger part of the international community is motivated by past events such as its lack of influence in the Cold War and the recent rise in global Terrorism.

== History of Canada's International Policy Statement ==
The need for the IPS was born on September 11th, 2001, when the western world was reminded of their vulnerability at the hands of Al-Qaeda. This unprecedented attack on North American soil profoundly shocked Canada and the U.S., especially considering Canada's dependence on America for defence. When Canadian troops were deployed with the U.S. military to Afghanistan, it challenged previously understood ideas about Canadian Foreign policy. An "unexpected war" against terrorism, coupled with the invasions of Iraq by allied forces, stretched Canadian soldiers thin, to the extent that it forced Canada to seriously consider changing foreign policy to combat rising global insecurity. This insecurity coupled with an upcoming federal election, gave way to the liberal government introducing the International Policy Statement.

== Defence ==
The defence section of the international policy statement is a guide for the Canadian forces in their operations, assisting the Department of National defence in the development of a sustainable long term program. The Policy emphasizes three broad roles for the Canadian forces; Protecting Canadians, Defending North America with the United States, and contributing to international peace and security. The statement is meant to address and build on previous public consultations regarding defence such as those carried out during the 2002-03 Defence update. International, and domestic security will be bolstered by an additional 5,000 regular personnel as well as 3,000 reserves. The largest perceived international threats to security include: terrorism, failing and failed states, weapons of mass destruction and regional flash-points such as North Korea and the Israeli-Palestine conflict.

Cooperation with U.S and Protecting North America

· Strengthening ability to counter threats in Canada; improving monitoring effectiveness, controlling air activity and maritime approaches to NA

· Improving US, Canadian military relations, combined training exercises and exploring enhancement options for bi-national defence

· Continuing to participate in international operations overseas

Protecting Canada:

· Working closely with civil authorities to prevent serious threats to Canada from materializing, countering those that do materialize, and mitigating consequences of attacks

· Increasing security efforts to ensure security and sovereignty of the Canadian territory, including the Arctic

· Dedicating more resources, such as people, training and equipment to expand their presence across the country by improving timeliness of troop and equipment arrival

International involvement:

· Missions should support Canadian foreign policy objectives, with realistic, clear mandates with international political and financial support in order to achieve the desired end

· Mission partners should have an effective consultation process including the discussion of clear exit strategy and a desired end

· The concept of operations, effective command and control structure, along with rules of engagement are predefined

· If the mission does not jeopardize other Canadian Forces

== Diplomacy ==
The diplomacy section focuses on remaining a very active part of the global community and economy through many specific diplomatic priorities and initiatives. The main diplomatic objectives the policy statement brings to light is the fostering of the North American partnership, making distinctive contributions to help build a more secure world, promoting and reforming multilateralism to tackle global issues, and finally re-establishing bilateral relationships beyond North America. In order to complete these objectives foreign affairs will be revamped, especially with respect to increased policy capacity, internal restructuring focused on a central North American branch in foreign affairs, establishing a "Stabilization and Reconstruction" task force, and pursuing public diplomacy more aggressively, making sure Canada's voice is clearly heard and understood. Furthermore, the policy states the importance of foreign policy as it affects our food, our health, and our quality of life, giving the example of the SARS outbreak to illustrate the speed and severity of which an international problem can affect Canadian society.

Canada-U.S. Foreign affairs, priorities:

· Modernizing security relationship taking into account evolving threats facing North America

· Identifying issues Canada and the U.S. both face

· Promoting further environmental cooperation and

· Getting Canadian messages across more effectively, including using the Canadian secretariat in the Washington embassy

North American diplomatic initiatives:

· Counterterrorism: continue to work with the US combining counterterrorist programs such as the National Counter-Terrorism Center in the U.S. and Canada's integrated threat assessment centre.

· The North American Aerospace Defence Command agreement was renewed in 2006, Canada continues to build on NORAD by exploring with the US, new ways to enhance continental security

· Control of the proliferation of WMD's

· Addressing new health threats, such as infectious disease.

Building a secure world, priorities:

· Dealing with failed and fragile states

· Countering terrorism and organized crime

· Combatting the proliferation and distribution of WMDs

· Promoting human security

Building a secure world, initiatives:

· Building a task force responsible for quickly determining the extent of crises and how the government should respond based on expertise drawn from across government and the United States

New multilateralism, priorities:

· Focus on advancing democracy through good governance, human rights protection and respect for diversity

· Multilateralism should support more effective sustainable development strategies

· Strengthen international development, such as health policy coordination

New Multilateralism, initiatives:

· Continue strong support for new international Criminal Court and the war for crimes tribunals for Rwanda and former Yugoslavia

· Providing $500,000 for the court's mandate to investigate crimes against humanity, provide $5 million to the high commissioner's office to strengthen monitoring capacity

· Working with international security agencies, especially those in Europe with focus on protecting human rights within member countries

Transformation of Foreign affairs, initiatives:

· Foreign affairs will rebuild their policy capacity and ability

The IPS envisions Foreign affairs as:

· Interpreter of international events and trends,

· Articulating distinctive Canadian international policy,

· Advocating Canada's values abroad,

· Providers of passport services

· Steward of public funds, able to deliver common services abroad

Strengthening Global presence consists of:

· Reconfiguring network of missions in regions of interest such as Asia and the Middle east, partnering with other departments

· Reversing imbalances of officers in Ottawa and missions abroad, enabled by a $42 million grant

· Emphasis on third language training for international environment

· Ensuring Canadian people, embassies and missions are secured in post 9/11 environment, enabled by $52 million grant

Enhanced toolkit and structural changes:[4]

· International security, especially concerning failed states, counterterrorism and proliferation of WMD

· Bilateral relations allowing FA to easily move resources between countries and regions based on priorities, promoting "whole-of-Canada" approaches abroad

== How effective has the IPS been? ==
Five years after the release the IPS has not been a significant factor in guiding Canada's foreign policy, this is due largely to the

shift from liberal to Conservative government, as a result of the federal election of 2006. Diplomatic changes outlined by the IPS such as the restructuring of Foreign affairs met heavy resistance in parliament. The conservative government has cherry-picked from the IPS, initiatives they agree with, such as the heavier focus on fragile states/ zones of international interest such as Israel. The Stability and Reconstruction task force was reorganized to handle high level foreign policy efforts such as Canada's Global Peace and Security Fund. Results of diplomatic priorities have been successful in building North American partnerships and building a more secure world. Defensively, the IPS has been significantly altered, as the conservative government has focused on achieving diplomacy goals through the addition of defence and security. Canada's top down focus on defence has had many critics, calling the military top heavy. Naval improvements seemed to lack the most, as many shortcomings and complexities, such as ship building teams not able to meet Canadian capability requirements. However, the Conservative governments interest in accelerating many defensive aspects of the IPS has revitalized the Canadian forces to the extent that they can focus on maintaining Arctic sovereignty, and security, while also effectively responding to domestic situations. Development goals such as global reduction of policy have not been reached as efforts have shifted to security in fragile and failing states, instead of focusing on food shortages. The commerce section of the IPS has been deemed insignificant in light of the housing crisis of 2006, where a lack of new ideas in the IPS forced Canada to improvise.

== See also ==
- Liberalism
