= Genocide education =

Genocide education refers to education about patterns and trends in the phenomenon of genocide and/or about the causes, nature and impact of particular instances of genocide.

== Genocide education textbooks ==
Since the early 2000s a number of scholars have published textbooks offering overviews of the many genocides throughout history. One of the very first was Samuel Totten, author and main editor of publications that range from annotated bibliographies to anthologies of first-person accounts and scholarly essays, as well as collections about Pioneers of Genocide Studies (2002) and Teaching about Genocide (2004). His most important textbook is Century of Genocide: Eyewitness Accounts and Critical Views, co-edited with Israel Charney and William S. Parsons. It was first published in 1995, with expanded editions in 1997, 2004, 2009, 2012 and 2022 (expanding from 532 to 736 pages).

Among other comprehensive overviews of genocides intended for use in teaching are:

- Adam Jones, Genocide: A Comprehensive Introduction (2006, updated editions in 2010, 2017 and 2024), 430-766 pages.
- Martin Shaw, What is Genocide? (2006, 2015), 232 pages.
- Ben Kiernan, Blood and Soil: A World History of Genocide and Extermination from Sparta to Darfur (2007), 768 pages.
- Paul R. Bartrop, Genocide: The Basics (2015), 200 pages.
- Norman Naimark, A World History of Genocide (2017), 192 pages.
- Lisa Pine, Debating Genocide (2019), 218 pages.

== Education about the Holocaust ==
"Genocide education" deals with the phenomenon of genocide, while education about the Holocaust focuses above all on the causes and dynamics of the genocide of the Jewish people and responses to it. However, both fields are increasingly interconnected. Genocide studies – referring to academic research about the broader trends and patterns of genocide and mass atrocities – and genocide education have become more widespread in universities and schools, as genocide and mass atrocities are recurring phenomena in the world. The studies have expanded to examine theories about how and why genocide happens. Education about the particular event of the Holocaust includes considerations about the concept, planning and implementation of that genocide, and can prompt reflections as to how what we learn about the Holocaust can contribute to the prevention of mass atrocities today.

== Educating about genocide in Rwanda ==
Recent Rwanda history curricula explicitly stipulate the teaching of the 1994 genocide of the Tutsi, notably through the comparison "of different genocides" with a view to "suggest ways of preventing genocide from happening again in Rwanda and elsewhere". A comparative approach has been adopted, which is clearly reflected in the 2015 Curriculum for Sustainable Development.

The competence-based curriculum framework mentions "genocide studies" as a cross-cutting issue, therefore introducing the study of genocide in a variety of subject areas. It further states that "Rwandan children should know about the genocide perpetrated against the Tutsi alongside the Holocaust and other genocides".

Teaching about the 1994 genocide of the Tutsi in Rwanda, and thereby introducing genocide studies in history textbooks and curricula, has been part of a gradual process to promote national unity and peace. This process included a moratorium on some chapters of Rwandan history in 1995, which ended when considerations pertaining to the 1994 genocide were introduced into the 2008 history curriculum. Recent approaches also built on the acknowledgement of the disastrous effects of pre-genocide Rwandan education, which contributed to discrimination against the Tutsi population and constituted a backdrop for the ideology that led to the genocide. In contrast, introducing the history of the genocide in the education system was a recognition that schools, in addition to non-formal and informal learning environments, are crucial venues to impart knowledge about the genocide and to overcome silence, denial and conflict. These changes also correspond to a deeper reflection on appropriate pedagogies to help learners grapple with the legacy of the genocide. According to Jean-Damascène Gasanabo, director-general of the Research and Documentation Center on Genocide at the National Commission for the Fight against Genocide (CNLG) in Kigali, "This change in the curriculum has been supplemented by a shift to transform learning from one based on standard rote memorization to one that encourages discussion and a spirit of critical thinking and analysis. This approach identifies the student as an active participant in the learning experience, not merely a silent recipient of history as 'evangelical speech'."

Aegis Trust's Sustainable Peace Model/Framework

The Kigali Genocide Memorial and Aegis Trust, in partnership with other Rwandan organizations such as the Educators' Institute for Human Rights, has developed education programmes and in-service training to help teachers build capacity and acquire historical knowledge to deal with genocides and mass atrocities. Such programmes emphasize "critical thinking, empathy and individual moral responsibility." They explore historical examples, primarily the genocide of the Jewish people and the genocide of the Tutsi, through a "Sustainable Peace Model/Framework" which seeks to link genocide education (looking back) to genocide prevention (looking into the present) to peace-building (looking forward).

== The Role of gender ==
Scholars and educators are increasingly recognizing and exploring gender as a dimension of genocide and other mass atrocities. Educators may wish to consider how gender influences, affects, and manifests itself in genocide, from the strategies of its perpetrators to the experiences of its victims.

Historically, most atrocities have been committed by men. Genocide scholar Adam Jones, however, notes that "when women, along with men, are mobilized, forced, encouraged, allowed to participate in genocide and other atrocious violence, they generally display no more reluctance than (often reluctant) males". Wendy Lower, for example, studied the role of German women during the Third Reich and found that relative to their role in German society and their professional positions, women participated in the perpetration of crimes "as zealous administrators, robbers, tormentors, and murderers".

Gender can shape and dictate both the experiences of victims and the methods perpetrators employ when committing genocide and mass atrocities. Roles often relegated to the female sphere can influence the fates of women. As traditional caregivers, for example, women who provide direct care for children or elderly relatives may inadvertently hinder or eliminate their own ability to survive genocidal violence. At the same time, perpetrators often differently persecute men and women. During the Holocaust, pregnant women and mothers of small children were consistently labeled "incapable of work". Consequently, women often found themselves among the first sent to the gas chambers. Aggressors' intent on a symbolic and physical disruption of group reproduction often target women and girls for sexualized violence, such as mass rape or forced sterilization. Cases also exist in which boys and men have been systematically sexually victimized. Transgressions of gender norms such as homosexuality and transsexuality have also served as grounds for the targeting of both men and women.

== See also ==
- Genocide prevention
- Peace education

== Sources ==
This article incorporates text from a free content work. Licensed under CC-BY-SA IGO 3.0 (license statement/permission). Text taken from Education about the Holocaust and preventing genocide, 18, 30, 34-35, 51-52, UNESCO, UNESCO. UNESCO.
