= Antiquities Coalition =

Non-governmental organization working to stop the looting and trafficking of antiquities

- Type: 501(c)(3)
- Headquarters: Washington, D.C.
- Region served: International
- Chairman and Co-Founder: Deborah Lehr
- Executive Director: Tess Davis
- Website: theantiquitiescoalition.org

The Antiquities Coalition (AC) is a non-governmental organization working to stop the looting and trafficking of antiquities. It is headquartered in Washington, D.C.

The AC was founded in the aftermath of the Egyptian Revolution in January 2011, when, in the weeks after the uprising, reports of cultural racketeering lit up archaeological hotlines due to the plundering of ancient sites, museums, storerooms, and places of worship.

This looting crisis inspired the creation of the International Coalition to Protect Egyptian Antiquities (ICPEA), which developed a public-private partnership with the Egyptian Ministry of Antiquities: the first of its kind. The AC was founded in 2014 in order to host other initiatives similar to the ICPEA, and expand its model to other countries in times of crisis.

== Projects ==
The Antiquities Coalition is leading the global campaign against cultural racketeering: the looting and trafficking of ancient art. This industry finances organized crime, armed conflict, and extremism around the world. The Antiquities Coalition partners with leaders from the public and private sectors, tackles plunder-for-profit head on. Through independent research and outside collaborations, they develop and implement solutions, helping communities and even countries in crisis.

AC works with experts to analyze the illegal antiquities trade, which the Congressional Research Service has named as a major source of funding for the Islamic State of Iraq and the Levant. AC also builds archeological databases, and organizes conferences and roundtables, sometimes with Middle East officials responsible for the antiquities trade. In May 2015, the Antiquities Coalition organized the Culture Under Threat Conference in Cairo on the theft of antiquities.

In June 2020, After pressure from many groups, including the Antiquities Coalition, Facebook announced new rules that would ban the exchange, sale, and purchase of all "historical artifacts" on its site and on Instagram.

== See also ==
- Antiquities
- Antiquities trade
- Looted art
- Archaeological looting in Iraq
- Ancient art
- Islamic State of Iraq and the Levant
