= Adama Dieng =

Senegalese lawyer

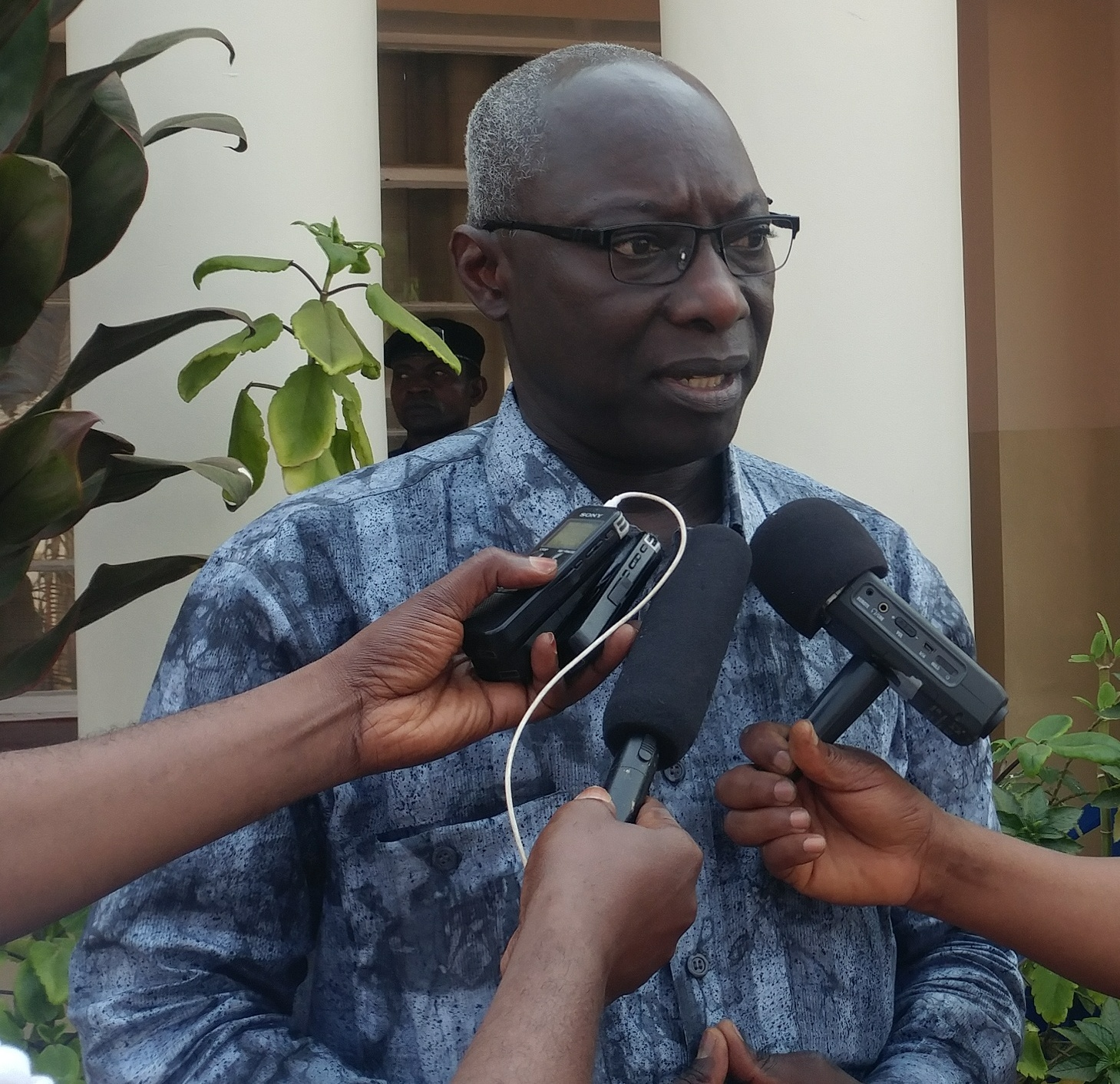

Special Adviser on the Prevention of Genocide
- In office 17 July 2012 – 2020
- Secretary-General: António Guterres
- Preceded by: Francis Deng
- Succeeded by: Alice Wairimu Nderitu

Adama Dieng (born 22 May 1950, Senegal) is a former UN Special Adviser on the Prevention of Genocide succeeded by Alice Wairimu Nderitu of Kenya. He is a former board member of the International Institute for Democracy and Electoral Assistance and a former registrar of the International Criminal Tribunal for Rwanda. He was designated an expert on human rights in Sudan on November 12, 2021, by the UN.

== Education and career ==
Adama Dieng holds degrees in law from Dakar University (CFPA) and in international law from the Research Centre of The Hague Academy of International Law. His legal career started in Senegal where he held several positions before becoming registrar of Supreme Court of Senegal and, from 1976 to 1982, personal assistant to its president. He then served as Legal Officer of Africa for the International Commission of Jurists from 1982 to 1989, Executive Secretary (1989–1990) and Secretary-General from October 1990 to May 2000.

UN Secretary-General Kofi Annan appointed him in January 2001 as the Registrar of the International Criminal Tribunal for Rwanda. He has worked as a consultant for many international organizations including UNITAR, the Organisation of African Unity, the Ford Foundation, UNESCO, the Organisation internationale de la Francophonie, the United Nations and the International Committee of the Red Cross. He is a council member of the Observatoire Panafricain de la Démocratie, a member of the executive committee of Africa Leadership Forum and a board member of the International Institute of Human Rights. Dieng, a Muslim, strongly criticized the Cairo Declaration on Human Rights in Islam, saying, among other things, that it introduced "intolerable discrimination against both non-Muslims and women".

On 17 July 2012, UN Secretary-General Ban Ki-moon appointed him the Special Adviser of the Secretary-General on the Prevention of Genocide, a position that he held until 2020, when he was succeeded by Alice Wairimu Nderitu.

== Some publications ==
- L'Organisation internationale du travail et la justice sociale
- The Quest Forward - which way forward for Africa
- Democracy and the Rule of Law
- The Role of Lawyers and Judges on the International Stage
- Nature of Conflicts
- The International Covenant on Civil and Political Rights
- New trends in Human Rights and Corruption in Africa
