= Aegis Trust =

British anti-genocide NGO (2000-)

The Aegis Trust, founded in 2000, is a British NGO which campaigns to prevent genocide worldwide. Based at the United Kingdom's Holocaust Centre, which opened in 1995, the Aegis Trust coordinates the UK Genocide Prevention All-Party Parliamentary Group, funds the Genocide Prevention Group (Canada) and is responsible for the Kigali Genocide Memorial Centre in Rwanda, which commemorates the 1994 genocide and is central to education of a new generation about the dangers of ethnic division.

== History ==
The Aegis Trust was founded by brothers James and Stephen Smith, as a progression from their establishment of the National Holocaust Centre and Museum (formerly Beth Shalom), the UK Holocaust memorial centre, in 1995. The outbreak of the Kosovo crisis in 1999 provided the catalyst for the development of Aegis. Troubled by the repetition of genocidal violence, the Smiths responded by initiating a regional aid appeal in the East Midlands. In 2002, Aegis hosted a joint conference with the Foreign and Commonwealth Office. Aegis' work follows three strands: education, protection and survivor support.

== Aegis Trust Award ==
Created in 2002 by the Aegis Trust, the Aegis Trust Award is made "for altruism, resourcefulness and bravery in preserving the value of human life". The award is intended to honour individuals who, by actions in contrast to the majority, demonstrate a respect for human life that transcends ideology, politics, expediency, personal or career interests and even personal safety, under circumstances in which people's lives are threatened because of their identity as part of a group subject to mass violence. The Award recognises preservation of the value of human life, rather than preservation of life itself. It is about the values and courage behind a set of actions, rather than about the objective success or failure of those actions in achieving the intended outcome. The prize is awarded on the basis of personal merit, even if the recipient was in the employment of an organisation at the time of the actions being recognised. The Award consists of a diploma, the 'Aegis' medallion and a sum of money. The Award is international and may be given to anyone anywhere.

Canadian Lt. Gen. Roméo Dallaire was the recipient of the inaugural Aegis Award, for his efforts as UN Force Commander in Rwanda to prevent or curtail the Rwandan genocide of 1994, despite being ordered by his superiors on three occasions to withdraw. The Award was presented to the General by Rt. Hon. Peter Hain MP, then Minister of State for Foreign Affairs (UK), at Westminster Central Hall in London - symbolic as the venue for the very first General Assembly of the United Nations in 1946.

== STAND ==
STAND (formerly known as Students Taking Action Now: Darfur) is a student activist group that merged with the Aegis Trust in April 2015. Founded in 2003 at Georgetown University as the student-led division of United to End Genocide, STAND opposes violence in Burma, the Democratic Republic of the Congo, Sudan, South Sudan, and Syria.
