= Canadian genocide of Indigenous peoples =

Acts of genocide committed against Indigenous peoples in Canada

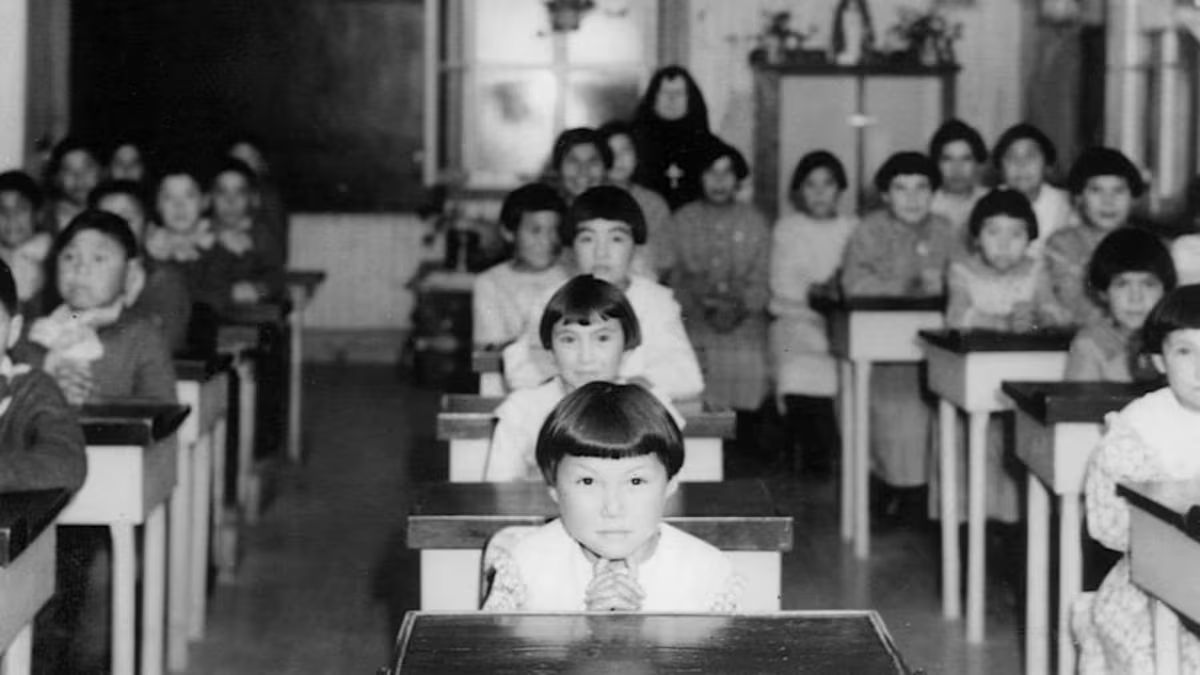
- Cree Nation of Chisasibi children attending the Catholic residential school of Fort George, Quebec, 1939
- Location: Canada
- Target: First Nations; Inuit; Métis
- Attack type: Genocide, ethnic cleansing, forced displacement, collective punishment, sexual abuse, starvation, forced conversion
- Assailants: Government of Canada, Catholic Church, Anglican Church, United Church, and Presbyterian Church
- Motive: Christianization; Religious discrimination; French imperialism; British imperialism; Settler colonialism; White supremacy

Throughout the history of Canada, the Canadian government, its colonial predecessors, and European settlers perpetrated systematic violence against Indigenous peoples (Note: The word Indigenous is capitalized when used in a Canadian context; see Wikipedia:Manual of Style/Canada-related articles#Capitalization) that increasingly has been described as genocide and cultural genocide. The treatment has also been described as ethnic cleansing and crimes against humanity. These collective actions included forced displacement, land dispossession, medical segregation, deliberate starvation policies, nutrition experiments, physical violence, and compulsory cultural assimilation programs.

Canada is a settler-colonial nation whose initial economy relied on farming and exporting natural resources like fur, fish, and lumber. European Canadians initially had peaceful treaties with First Nations and Inuit, but these changed to dispossession treaties, and forced assimilation, emphasizing European values like Christianity, farming, and education. The Canadian government implemented policies such as the Indian Act, (Note: The term Indian has been used in keeping with page name guidelines because of the historical nature of the page and the precision of the name. The use of the name also provides relevant context about the era in which the system was established, specifically one in which Indigenous peoples in Canada were homogeneously referred to as Indians rather than by language that distinguishes First Nations, Inuit and Métis peoples. Use of Indian is limited throughout the page to proper nouns and references to government legislation.) internal passports and residential schools and asserted control over the land and its resources. In response, a number of Indigenous communities mobilized to resist colonial policies and assert their rights to self-determination and sovereignty.

Although the Canadian Historical Association considers that the treatment of Indigenous peoples constitutes genocide, forms of Indigenous genocide denialism such as residential school denialism, are still a component of Canadian society. A period of redress began with the formation of the Truth and Reconciliation Commission of Canada by the Government of Canada in 2008. This included recognition of cultural genocide, Indian Residential Schools Settlement Agreements, and betterment of racial discrimination issues, such as addressing the plight of Missing and Murdered Indigenous Women.

== Scholarly debate ==
The debate over Indigenous genocide globally is complicated and contentious. According to certain genocide scholars, including Raphael Lemkin – the individual who coined the term genocide – colonialism was intimately connected with genocide. Other genocide experts, such as Steven Katz, narrowly define genocide in the context of the Holocaust, arguing it requires the complete physical eradication of a group. The overlap of law and history leads to different views on genocide. The law focuses on serious acts, limiting it to physical and biological aspects, and requiring intent to destroy a group. Historians investigate the broader complexities of genocides, including long-term processes and various motives, without strict legal definitions. The main debate centers around the definitions of genocide, as outlined in the United Nations Genocide Convention, and within the Canadian context, the Rome Statute of which is defined in Canada's Crimes Against Humanity and War Crimes Act.

The majority of Canadian historians agree that the treatment of Indigenous peoples by European settlers and subsequent Canadian governments constitutes genocide; despite, this Indigenous genocide denialism is still a component of Canadian society. Some scholars, such as William Schabas and Payam Akhavan, have questioned whether genocide legally applies to Canada's history, as genocidal intent as outlined in the Genocide convention is very difficult to establish, and have argued that the broader term "crimes against humanity" may be more fitting and legally applicable. Scholars like David MacDonald and Graham Hudson argue that Article 2 (e) would include residential schools in the Genocide Convention as currently worded. Other scholars, namely Pamela Palmater and James Daschuk, have used the term ethnic cleansing to describe the displacement and removal of Indigenous peoples from the Canadian prairies.

External videos
- " Is it really genocide? In Canada?" (2019) – TVO (7:25 min)

The Truth and Reconciliation Commission of Canada (TRC) in its final report in 2015 use the specific term cultural genocide, when it addressed the history of the Indigenous residential school system. The TRC's final report stated "cultural genocide is the destruction of those structures and practices that allow the group to continue as a group".

In 2019 the National Inquiry into Missing and Murdered Indigenous Women and Girls (MMIWG) concluded that the crisis constituted an ongoing "race, identity and gender-based genocide." The MMIWG inquiry used the definition of genocide as outlined in the Canadian Crimes Against Humanity and War Crimes Act, instead of the Genocide Convention, that the inquiry saw as "narrow" and based on the Holocaust.

In 2021, the Canadian Historical Association (CHA), which includes 650 professional historians, stated that the history of violence against Indigenous peoples in Canada warrants the use of the term genocide. They asserted that there is broad agreement among historians about the negative effects of institutionalized genocide on Indigenous peoples over the past 150 years.

An open letter published in The Dorchester Review by a group of 50 historians, initiated by Christopher Dummitt, criticized the CHA for advocating a specific historical interpretation, which they believe undermines the academic freedom necessary for historical debate. Signatories of the open letter, which includes Margaret Macmillan, Terry Copp, Frédéric Bastien, J. L. Granatstein, Robert J. Young and Susan Mann, disagree with the CHA's claim of broad consensus, reiterating the government's documented goal was integration, not elimination. They criticized attempts to shut down debate or discredit dissent as well as portraying those who disagree or diverge from activist language as prejudiced or outdated.

In response to the open letter, Sean Carleton and Andrew Woolford summarized the CHA position arguing that the existence of this dissenting group, many of whom they alleged are not part of the CHA and some they allege who deny residential schools, does not change what they characterize as broad academic agreement that genocide applies to Canada. Carleton and Woolford argued that dissent and debate from what they name as "the fringe" are actually strategies used by genocide denialists to create doubt and undermine consensus.

== Settler colonialism ==
=== Assimilation ===
The Numbered Treaties signed between 1871 and 1921 transferred large tracts of land from the First Nations to Canada in return for different promises laid out in each treaty.

Attempts to assimilate Indigenous peoples were rooted in imperial colonialism centred around European worldviews and cultural practices, and a concept of land ownership based on the discovery doctrine. Original assimilation efforts were religiously oriented beginning in the 17th century with the arrival of French missionaries in New France.

Although not without conflict, European Canadians' early interactions with First Nations and Inuit populations were relatively peaceful. First Nations and Métis peoples (of mixed European and Indigenous ancestry) played a critical part in the development of European colonies in Canada, particularly for their role in assisting European coureur des bois and voyageurs in their explorations of the continent during the North American fur trade.

The early European interactions with First Nations would change from friendship and peace treaties to dispossession of lands through treaties, displacement and forced assimilation legislation such as the Gradual Civilization Act, the Indian Act, the Potlatch ban, and the pass system, that focused on European ideals of Christianity, sedentary living, agriculture, and education.

=== Impact of colonization ===
The great aim of our legislation (Indian Act) has been to do away with the tribal system and assimilate the Indian people in all respects with the other inhabitants of the Dominion as speedily as they are fit to change.

— Prime Minister of Canada - Sir John A Macdonald (1887)

I want to get rid of the Indian problem. I do not think as a matter of fact, that the country ought to continuously protect a class of people who are able to stand alone. . . . Our objective is to continue until there is not a single Indian in Canada that has not been absorbed into the body politic and there is no Indian question, and no Indian Department, that is the whole object of this Bill.

— Department of Indian Affairs - Duncan Campbell Scott (1920)

The impact of colonization on Canada can be seen in its culture, history, politics, laws, and legislatures. This led to the systematic removal of Indigenous children from their families, the suppression of Indigenous languages and traditions, and the degradation of Indigenous communities. Other actions which have been highlighted as indicative of genocide include sporadic massacres, the spread of disease, the prohibition of cultural practices, and the ecological devastation of indigenous territories.

As a consequence of European colonization, the Indigenous population massively declined. The decline is attributed to several causes, including the transfer of European introduced diseases, conflicts over the fur trade, conflicts with the colonial authorities and settlers, and the loss of Indigenous lands to settlers and the subsequent collapse of several nations' self-sufficiency. This resulted in the dispossession of lands and forced migration of Indigenous peoples using various justifications. Roland G. Robertson suggests that during the late 1630s, smallpox killed over half of the Wyandot (Huron), who controlled most of the early fur trade in the area of New France. During the 17th century Beaver Wars, the Haudenosaunee brutally destroyed large tribal confederacies like the Mohicans, Wyandot, Neutral, Erie, Susquehannock, and northern Algonquins. Some historians have call these actions genocidal, while highlight the fact British and Dutch merchants encouraged and armed the Haudenosaunee.

The most well documented impact of colonization in Canada is the Indian Residential School System that was intended to assimilate the population. Other examples include the forced relocation of Inuit populations during the cold war to propagate Canadian sovereignty, medical segregation that led to poor conditions and lack of innovations being implemented, the sterilization of Indigenous men and women, and the modern day plight of violence and discrimination faced by Indigenous females being marginalized.

Some scholars suggest Indigenous groups in Canada still suffer from the effects of settler colonialism. This manifests in forms of racially motivated discrimination, such as criminal justice inequity, police brutality and high incarceration rates, that have been subject to legal and political review.

=== Indigenous resistance ===
External videos
- " Indigenous Peoples of North America " Interview with professor Andrew Woolford - ZI e-Chronicles (2:06 mins)

Indigenous response to colonialism in Canada dates back before its founding. Historically, Indigenous resistance in Canada has taken the form of some violent rebellions, protests, blockades, legal challenges, and cultural revitalization efforts, all aimed at challenging the policies and practices of the Canadian government and asserting Indigenous sovereignty over their traditional territories. During the 20th century, various Indigenous groups emerged to address issues like land loss, unrecognized rights, harmful policies, and poor conditions on reserves.

The Lachine massacre of 1689 during the Beaver Wars, saw 1,500 Haudenosaunee warriors invade the small settlement of Lachine in New France, which had 375 residents. This attack was due to Haudenosaunee anger over French expansion that resulted in the capture of many and the killing of about 24 French inhabitants. In the 1800s, Louis Riel led the Métis in the Red River and North West Rebellions to fight for land and governance rights.

In 1967, the National Indian Brotherhood and other groups opposed the White Paper, which aimed to eliminate the Indian Act and the limited rights of Indigenous peoples. During the Oka Crisis in 1990, the Kanien’kehá:ka (Mohawk) of Kanehsatà:ke protested against a golf course on their ancestral lands and faced military intervention. The Idle No More movement emerged in response to Bill C-45, which threatened environmental protections and treaty rights, utilizing various forms of activism to demand respect for treaties and Indigenous relationships. Chief Theresa Spence's hunger strike highlighted the poor conditions on Indigenous reserves. Recently, protests against a pipeline in Wet’suwet’en Nation territory met with government policing.

== Genocidal violence ==
=== The Beothuk ===
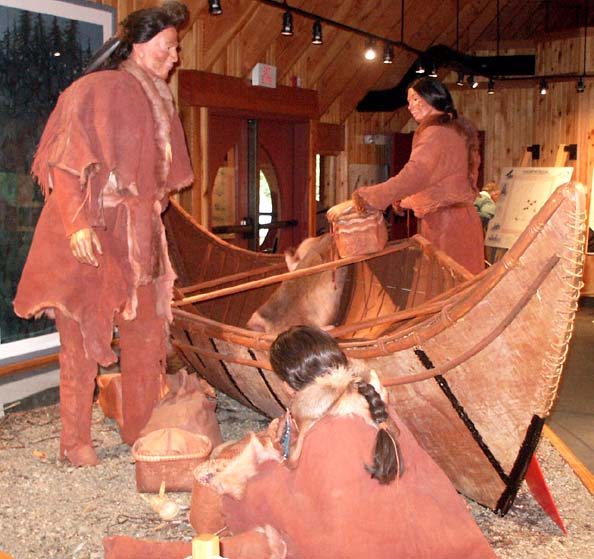
The Beothuk tribe of Newfoundland is extinct as a cultural group. It is represented in museum, historical and archaeological records.

With the death of Shanawdithit in 1829, the Beothuk people, and the Indigenous people of Newfoundland were officially declared extinct after suffering epidemics, starvation, loss of access to food sources, and displacement by English and French fishermen and traders. The Beothuks' main food sources were caribou, fish, and seals; their forced displacement deprived them of two of these. This led to the over-hunting of caribou, leading to a decrease in the caribou population in Newfoundland. The Beothuks emigrated from their traditional land and lifestyle, attempting to avoid contact with Europeans, into ecosystems unable to support them, causing under-nourishment and, eventually, starvation.

Governor John Byron's proclamation that "I do strictly enjoin and require all His Majesty's subjects to live in amity and brotherly kindness with the native savages [Beothuk] of the said island of Newfoundland", as well as the subsequent Proclamation issued by Governor John Holloway on July 30, 1807, which prohibited mistreatment of the Beothuk and offered a reward for any information on such mistreatment. Such proclamations seemed to have little effect as in 1766 Governor Hugh Palliser reported to the Secretary of State for the Northern Department, Augustus FitzRoy, 3rd Duke of Grafton, that "the barbarous system of killing prevails amongst our people towards the Native Indians — whom our People always kill, when they can meet them".

Scholars disagree in their definition of genocide in relation to the Beothuk. While some scholars believe that the Beothuk died out as an unintended consequence of European colonization, others argue that Europeans conducted a sustained campaign of genocide against them.

=== Pacific Northwest smallpox epidemics ===
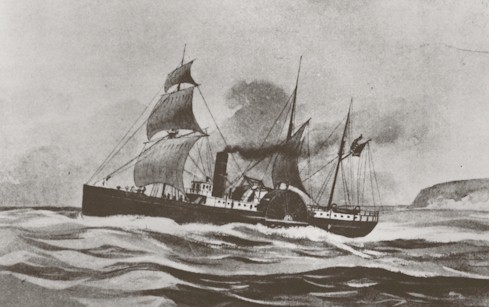
The Brother Jonathan docked at Victoria's Esquimalt Harbour on 12 March 1862, carrying smallpox infected passengers from San Francisco.

Pacific Northwest indigenous peoples experienced several earlier smallpox epidemics, about once per generation after European contact began in the late 18th century: in the late 1770s, 1801–03, 1836–38, and 1853. These epidemics are not as well documented in historical records as the 1862 Pacific Northwest smallpox epidemic.

The 1862 Pacific Northwest smallpox epidemic started in Victoria on Vancouver Island and spread among the indigenous peoples of the Pacific Northwest Coast and into the indigenous peoples of the Northwest Plateau, killing a large portion of Indigenous from the Puget Sound region to Southeast Alaska. Two-thirds of British Columbia Indigenous died—around 20,000 people.

While colonial authorities used quarantine, smallpox vaccine, and inoculation to keep the disease from spreading among colonists and settlers, it was largely allowed to spread among indigenous peoples. The Colony of Vancouver Island made attempts to save some Indigenous inhabitants, but most were forced to leave the vicinity of Victoria and go back to their homelands, despite awareness that it would result in a major smallpox epidemic among the Indigenous population of the Pacific Northwest coast. Many colonists and newspapers were vocally in favor of expulsion.

Some historians have described it as a deliberate genocide because the Colony of Vancouver Island and the Colony of British Columbia could have prevented the epidemic but chose not to, and in some ways facilitated it. According to historian Kiran van Rijn, "opportunistic self-interest, coupled with hollow pity, revulsion at the victims, and smug feelings of inevitability, shaped the colonial response to the epidemic among First Nations"; and that for some residents of Victoria the eviction of Indigenous peoples was a "long-sought opportunity" to be rid of them; and, for some, an opportunity to take over First Nation lands. At the time, and still today, some Indigenous leaders say that the colonial government deliberately spread smallpox for the purpose of stealing their land.

=== Residential schools ===
External videos
- "Residential Schools in Canada: A Timeline" (2020) – Historica Canada (3:59min)

Beginning in 1874 and lasting until 1996, the Canadian government, in partnership with the dominant Christian Churches, ran 130 residential boarding schools across Canada for Indigenous children, who were forcibly taken from their homes. Over the course of the system's existence, about 30% of Indigenous children, or roughly 150,000, were placed in residential schools nationally; at least 6,000 of these students died while in attendance. While the schools provided some education, they were plagued by under-funding, disease, abuse, and sexual abuse. The negative effects of the residential school system have long been accepted almost unanimously among scholars researching the residential school system, with debate focussing on the motives and intent.

Part of this process during the 1960s through the 1980s, dubbed the Sixties Scoop, was investigated and the child seizures deemed genocidal by Judge Edwin Kimelman, who wrote: "You took a child from his or her specific culture and you placed him into a foreign culture without any [counselling] assistance to the family which had the child. There is something dramatically and basically wrong with that." Another aspect of the residential school system was its use of forced sterilization on Indigenous women who chose not to follow the schools advice of marrying non-Indigenous men.

"They Came for the Children" a publication by the Truth and Reconciliation Commission

Indigenous people of Canada have long referred to the residential school system as genocide, with scholars referring to the system as genocidal since the 1990s. According to some scholars, the Canadian government's laws and policies, including the residential school system, that encouraged or required Indigenous peoples to assimilate into a Eurocentric society, violated the United Nations Genocide Convention that Canada signed in 1949 and passed through Parliament in 1952. Therefore, these scholars believe that Canada could be tried in international court for genocide. Others also point to the UN Declaration on the Rights of Indigenous Peoples, which was adopted into Canadian law in 2010, where article 7 discusses the rights of indigenous people to not be subjected to genocide or "any other act of violence, including forcibly removing children of the group to another group".

The executive summary of the TRC concluded that the assimilation amounted to cultural genocide. This conclusion has been supported by other scholars, including David Bruce MacDonald and Graham Hudson, who also comment that the residential school system may also amount to more than just cultural genocide, laying out specific arguments as to how the residential school system met the dolus specialis requirement of the Genocide Convention. The ambiguity of the phrasing in the TRC report allowed for the interpretation that physical and biological genocide also occurred. The TRC was not authorized to conclude that physical and biological genocide occurred, as such a finding would imply a legal responsibility of the Canadian government that would be difficult to prove. As a result, the debate about whether the Canadian government also committed physical and biological genocide against Indigenous populations remains open.

=== Nutrition experiments ===
The First Nations nutrition experiments were a series of experiments run in Canada by Department of Pensions and National Health (now Health Canada). The experiments were conducted between 1942 and 1952 using Indigenous children from residential schools in Alberta, British Columbia, Manitoba, Nova Scotia, and Ontario. The experiments were conducted on at least 1,300 Indigenous people across Canada, approximately 1,000 of whom were children. The deaths connected with the experiments have been described as part of Canada's genocide of Indigenous peoples.

The experiments involved nutrient-poor isolated communities such as those in The Pas and Norway House in northern Manitoba and residential schools and were designed to learn about the relative importance and optimum levels of newly discovered vitamins and nutritional supplements. The experiments included deliberate, sustained malnourishment and in some cases, the withholding of dental services.

In 2013 the Assembly of First Nations passed a resolution stating the experiments "reveal Crown conduct reflecting a pattern of genocide against aboriginal peoples."

=== Sterilizations ===
External videos
- " New report sheds light on forced sterilization in Indigenous women" (2022) – CBC (2:09 min)

The practice of forcibly sterilizing individuals deemed mentally unfit or "socially inadequate" was widespread in the early to mid-20th century. The belief was that by preventing these individuals from reproducing, society would be protected from the perceived negative impact of their genes. This led to compulsory sterilization of thousands of people, many of whom were Indigenous women, individuals with disabilities, and those deemed to have "undesirable" traits.

The legal basis for compulsory sterilization in Canada can be traced back to the passage of the Sexual Sterilization Act in Alberta in 1928. This legislation allowed for the sterilization of individuals deemed mentally deficient or mentally ill without their consent. Similar legislation existed in British Columbia, although records on sterilizations there are incomplete. Additionally, sterilizations occurred in Saskatchewan, Quebec, Manitoba, Ontario and other regions without specific legal frameworks. These practices remained in place until the 1970s, when public opinion began to shift and the practice was eventually deemed unethical and inhumane. Despite legislation Indigenous women allege they were coerced into consenting to sterilization, often during vulnerable moments such as childbirth, from the mid 1970s onwards. In June 2021, the Standing Committee on Human Rights in Canada found that compulsory sterilization is ongoing in Canada and its extent has been underestimated. A bill was introduced to Parliament in 2024 to end the practice.

Although Canadian eugenics beliefs and practices operated via institutionalization and medical judgements, similar to other nations at the time, some modern scholars contend this was a form of genocide, aimed at limiting the rights and existence of a group of people.

=== Displacement ===
Relocation from Inukjuak to Resolute (left arrow) and Grise Fiord (right arrow)

The High Arctic relocation happened in the context of the Cold War, the federal government forcibly relocated 87 Inuit citizens to the High Arctic as human symbols of Canada's assertion of ownership of the region. The Inuit were told that they would be returned home to Northern Quebec after two years if they wished, but this offer was later withdrawn as it would damage Canada's claims to the High Arctic; they were forced to stay. In 1993, after extensive hearings, the Royal Commission on Aboriginal Peoples issued The High Arctic Relocation: A Report on the 1953–55 Relocation.

An official government apology was given on August 18, 2010, to the relocated families for the inhumane treatment and suffering caused by the relocation. John Duncan (Minister of Indian Affairs and Northern Development) stated:

The Government of Canada deeply regrets the mistakes and broken promises of this dark chapter of our history and apologizes for the High Arctic relocation having taken place. We would like to pay tribute to the relocatees for their perseverance and courage...The relocation of Inuit families to the High Arctic is a tragic chapter in Canada's history that we should not forget, but that we must acknowledge, learn from and teach our children. Acknowledging our shared history allows us to move forward in partnership and in a spirit of reconciliation.

— John Duncan

=== Dog slaughter ===
The Nunavik dog slaughter was a practice that occurred between the 1950s and late 1960s where Royal Canadian Mounted Police from Ontario and Quebec were given orders to slaughter sled dogs from Indigenous Nunavik communities. These actions are widely believed to be taken in order to assimilate the Inuit population into the Nunavik area and curb the local nomadism. An investigation led by the RCMP in 2006 came to the conclusion the killings were carried out to stop sickness, hunger or to keep the dog populations within a certain limit. This report has been disputed by local groups for being biased and a cover up. Further reports uncovered the RCMP constable in charge of the local area became alarmed about reports of wild dogs, killing 250 in 1966 while also encouraging local Indigenous populations to kill their dogs as well. Officials in the federal government felt this may be an overreaction but further reports indicated decreasing numbers in the following year. A follow up report in 2010 created by Jean-Jacques Croteau, a retired Superior Court of Quebec judge found that Quebec provincial police officers had killed over 1,000 sled dogs between the 1950s and 60s "without any consideration for their importance to Inuit families".

On November 23, 2024, the Canadian government released an official apology from the minister of Crown-Indigenous Relations

I am here today to extend a formal apology on behalf of all Canadians and the Government of Canada for Canada's involvement in the Nunavik dog slaughter of the 1950s and 1960s. It is important for me to be here in Kangiqsujuaq, Nunavik, for this apology, to be with you in one of the communities where it happened. The dog slaughter occurred across Nunavik, spreading grief and devastation from the brutality. For this, words are not enough to express the sorrow and regret we feel. The actions and inactions that led to the mass killing of the qimmiit (sled dogs) inflicted deep pain and hardship on Inuit families that none should have had to endure.

— Gary Anandasangaree

=== Medical segregation ===
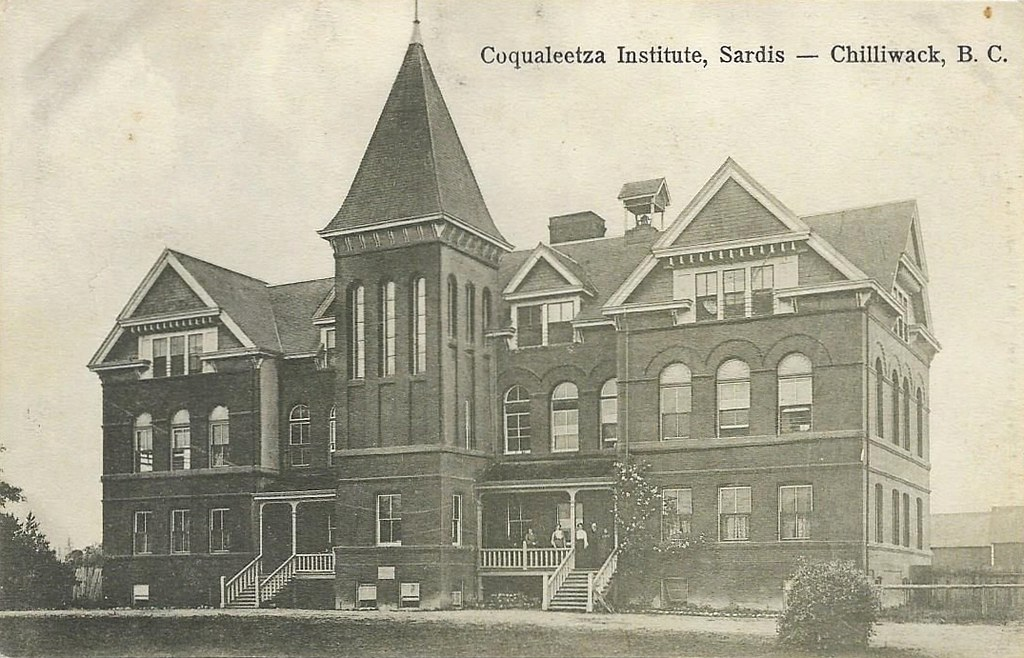
The Coqualeetza Indian Hospital which was located in Sardis, British Columbia,

The Indian hospitals were racially segregated hospitals, originally serving as tuberculosis sanatoria but later operating as general hospitals for Indigenous peoples in Canada which operated during the 20th century. The hospitals were originally used to isolate Indigenous tuberculosis patients from the general population because of a fear among health officials that "Indian TB" posed a danger to the non-indigenous population. Many of these hospitals were located on Indian reserves, and might also be called reserve hospitals, while others were in nearby towns. Low salaries, poor working conditions, and the isolated locations of many hospitals made it difficult to maintain adequate numbers of qualified staff. These hospitals also did not receive the same level of funding as facilities for non-Indigenous communities. Although treatment for tuberculosis in non-Indigenous patients improved during the 1940s and 1950s, these innovations were not propagated to the Indian hospitals. From 1949 to 1953, 374 experimental surgeries were performed on TB patients, without the use of general anesthetic at the Charles Camsell Indian Hospital.

=== Hospital alerts ===
Birth alerts (or hospital alerts) was a practice in Canada, in which a social or health care worker notifies the staff of a hospital if they have concerns for the safety of an expected child based on their parents' history. This can include past instances of poverty, domestic violence, drug usage, and history with child welfare. A birth alert could also be issued if the mother had undergone frequent moves, or had been in the foster care system herself as a child. Birth alerts are typically issued without the parents' consent, and often result in apprehension and placement of the child into foster care after birth.

Birth alerts have been considered a controversial practice, as they have been disproportionately used for Indigenous children. The Indigenous rights group Idle No More considers birth alerts to be one of the major "hardships" faced by Canada's Indigenous community. In June 2019, the Final Report of the National Inquiry into Missing and Murdered Indigenous Women and Girls (MMIWG) recommended the abolishment of "the practice of targeting and apprehending infants (hospital alerts or birth alerts) from Indigenous mothers right after they give birth", as they were "racist and discriminatory and are a gross violation of the rights of the child, the mother, and the community."

Indigenous children have been targeted by social services and the foster care system being labeled as "high risk" for having been in the foster care system. The removal of Indigenous children has further contributed to cultural genocide and generational trauma experienced by Indigenous peoples in Canada. Many Indigenous women subjected to a Birth Alert describe feeling surveilled by social services, or inappropriately harassed by the institution throughout their pregnancy, causing distress, fear, and feelings of anxiety.

=== Missing and murdered women ===
From 2016 to 2019, the Canadian government conducted the National Inquiry into Missing and Murdered Indigenous Women. The final report of the inquiry concluded that the high level of violence directed at First Nations, Inuit, and Metis women and girls is "caused by state actions and inactions rooted in colonialism and colonial ideologies." The National Inquiry commissioners said in the report and publicly that the MMIWG crisis is "a Canadian genocide." It also concluded that the crisis constituted an ongoing "race, identity and gender-based genocide."

External videos
- "B.C.‘s infamous Highway of Tears" (2006) - CBC Archives, (2:32, min)

The MMIWG inquiry used a broader definition of genocide from the Crimes Against Humanity and War Crimes Act which encompasses "not only acts of commission, but 'omission' as well." The inquiry described the traditional legal definition of genocide as "narrow" and based on the Holocaust. According to the inquiry, "colonial genocide does not conform with popular notions of genocide as a determinate, quantifiable event" and concluded that "these [genocidal] policies fluctuated in time and space, and in different incarnations, are still ongoing."

On June 3, 2019, Luis Almagro, secretary-general of Organization of American States (OAS), asked Foreign Affairs Minister Chrystia Freeland to support the creation of an independent probe into the MMIWG allegation of Canadian 'genocide' since Canada had previously supported "probes of atrocities in other countries" such as Nicaragua in 2018. On June 4, in Vancouver, Prime Minister Justin Trudeau said that, "Earlier this morning, the national inquiry formally presented their final report, in which they found that the tragic violence that Indigenous women and girls have experienced amounts to genocide."

== Reconciliation and acknowledgment ==
External videos
- " Canada's cultural genocide of Indigenous Peoples" (2017) – Canadian Broadcasting Corporation (3:59 min)

Canadian history has evolved significantly over the years, with early interpretations often downplaying or denying the extent of violence and harm inflicted on Indigenous peoples. In more recent years, there has been a growing recognition of the systemic nature of the atrocities perpetrated against Indigenous peoples in Canada. Indigenous leaders and scholars such as Phil Fontaine, Alice MacLachlan and David Bruce MacDonald have long argued that the Canadian government should "officially" recognize the totality of atrocities as "genocide". A period of redress and apologies to Indigenous peoples began in 2008 with the formation of the Truth and Reconciliation Commission by the Government of Canada, resulting in recognition of cultural genocide, settlement agreements, and betterment of racial discrimination issues, such as addressing the plight of Missing and Murdered Indigenous Women. The report also resulted in an apology by then Prime Minister Stephen Harper on behalf of the Canadian government and its citizens for the residential school system was issued.

In 2015, Supreme Court Chief Justice Beverly McLachlin said that Canada's historical treatment of Indigenous peoples was "cultural genocide". In October 2022, the House of Commons unanimously passed a motion to have the Canadian government officially recognize the residential school system as genocide against Indigenous populations. This acknowledgment was followed by a visit by Pope Francis who apologized for Church members' role in what he labeled the "oppression, mistreatment and cultural genocide of indigenous people". Scouts Canada also issued an apology for "its role in the eradication of First Nation, Inuit and Metis people for more than a century".

Since 2022 Library and Archives Canada "Harmful content advisory" states:

We acknowledge that archives can be sites of trauma for Indigenous peoples. Working with historical records that document experiences of genocide, assimilation, and oppression, as well as the inherent anti-Indigenous bias and offensive language in these records, can create feelings of distress, grief, and pain for researchers.

== Denialism ==
Despite decades of recognition and acknowledgments, residential school denialism is a factor within Canadian society. In 2022, Gregory Stanton, former president of the International Association of Genocide Scholars, issued a report stating Canada is in the "denial stage" of the ten stages of genocide.

External videos
- "Mythbusting Residential Schools were well-intentioned" (2024) – Sean Carleton - University of Manitoba (2:43 min)

On National Truth and Reconciliation Day in 2023, prime minister Justin Trudeau stating that denialism was on the rise after disputes regarding the conclusiveness of the evidence of Indian residential schools gravesite discoveries. Federal Justice Minister David Lametti said in 2023 that he was open to outlawing residential school denialism.

Kimberly Murray from the Office of the Independent Special Interlocutor, released a report in 2023 starting;

Some still deny that children suffered physical, sexual, psychological, cultural, and spiritual abuses, despite the TRC’s indisputable evidence to the contrary. Others try to deny and minimize the destructive impacts of the Indian Residential Schools. They believe Canada’s historical myth that the nation has treated Indigenous Peoples with benevolence and generosity is true.

The report prompted Leah Gazan, an NDP Member of Parliament, to introduce Bill C-413 in 2024, which would ban residential school denialism. However, legal scholars have previously asserted that a bill of this nature probably would not pass a constitutional challenge under the Canadian Charter.

== See also ==
- Bloody Falls massacre
- Genocide of Indigenous Australians
- List of Indian massacres in North America
- Long-term drinking water advisories (Canada)
- Native American genocide in the United States
- Cultural assimilation of Native Americans
