= Killaq Enuaraq-Strauss =

Canadian activist

- Born: Iqaluit, Nunavut, Canada

Killaq Enuaraq-Strauss is a Canadian activist of Inuit and Jewish heritage.

== Personal life ==
Enuaraq-Strauss was born and raised in Iqaluit, Nunavut, the daughter of an Inuk mother, Susan Enuaraq, and a Jewish father. Her mother's niece, Sula Arreak and Sula's two daughters, Alexandra and Aliyah Degrasse, were murdered in Iqaluit in 2011. Hours after the discovery of the murder, Sula's husband, Sylvain Degrasse, was found dead by gunshot in a local cemetery.

Growing up, Enuaraq-Strauss was the only child in her class with mixed Jewish and Inuit heritage. As a teenager, Enuaraq-Strauss moved to British Columbia to attend a boarding school. While in British Columbia, Enuaraq-Strauss began to reconnect with her Jewish heritage, attending synagogue and learning more about the laws of kashrut. She began to keep kosher and fast on Yom Kippur.

== Activism ==
Enuaraq-Strauss has argued that seal meat can be considered kosher. Citing the principle of "pikuach nefesh", she claims that it is acceptable for Inuit Jews to consume seal meat given that it is necessary for the survival of Inuit living in the Arctic. An advocate for environmental sustainability, she has emphasized the shared value within both Inuit and Jewish culture to treat animals humanely. Seals are traditionally considered non-kosher animals because water animals have to have scales to be considered kosher and kosher land animals must have split hooves and must chew their cud.

In 2014, Enuaraq-Strauss began an online "#Sealfies" campaign against Ellen DeGeneres. A fan of the Ellen Show, Enuaraq-Strauss started the campaign to educate DeGeneres on Inuit and Indigenous cultural traditions after DeGeneres endorsed People for the Ethical Treatment of Animals (PETA) campaign against seal hunting. Supporters of the #Sealfies hashtag campaign posted photographs of themselves wearing clothing and boots made from seal fur and sealskin.

In 2018, Enuaraq-Strauss and her mother Susan testified at Canada's National Inquiry into Missing and Murdered Indigenous Women, part of a wider investigation into Missing and Murdered Indigenous Women and Girls, when hearings were held in Rankin Inlet, Nunavut, providing testimony regarding the murder of their niece / cousin Sula Arreak.
