= National Inquiry into Missing and Murdered Indigenous Women and Girls =

Public inquiry in Canada 2016-2019

- French: l’Enquête nationale sur les femmes et les filles autochtones disparues et assassinées
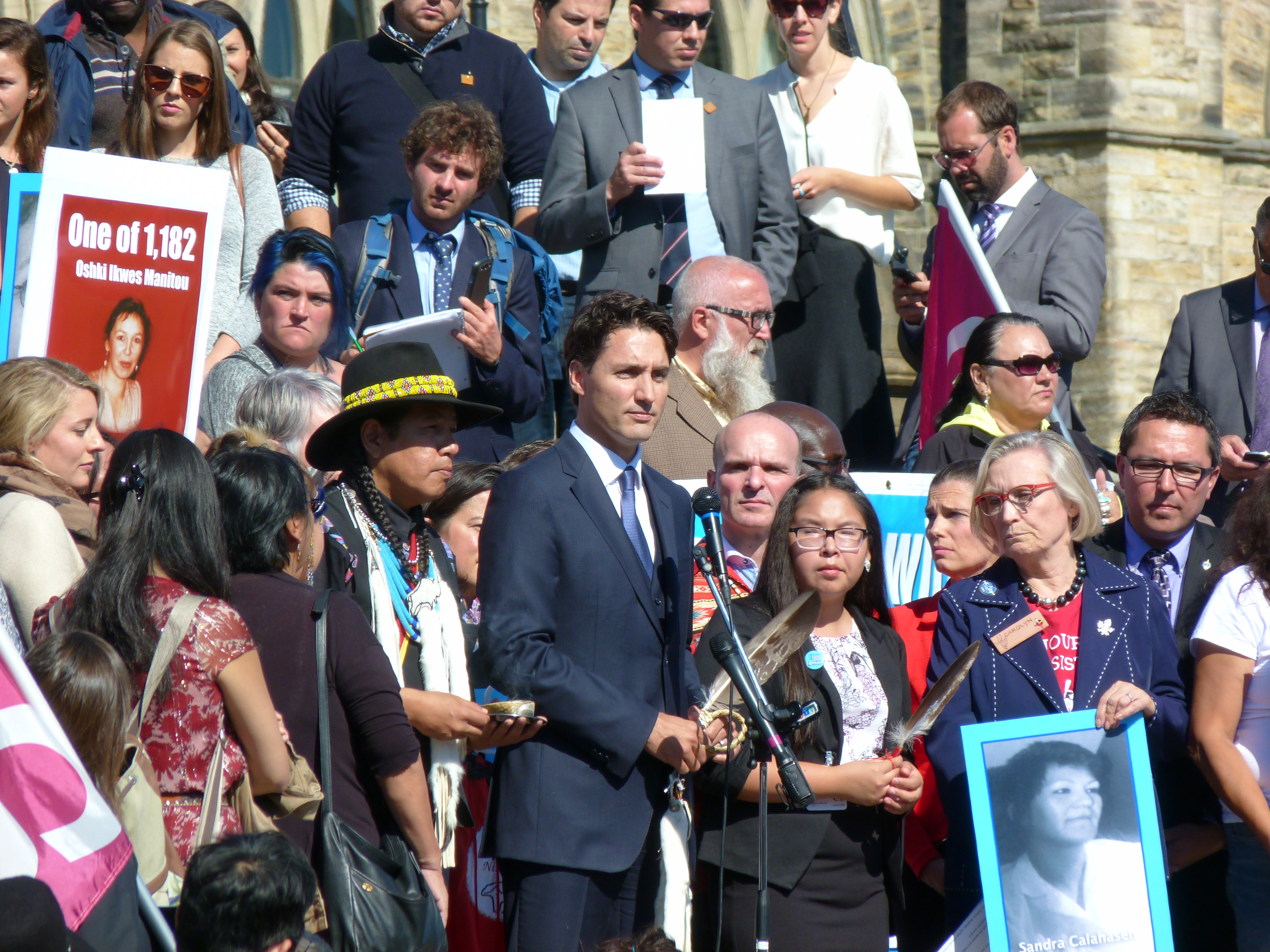
- Prime Minister of Canada, Justin Trudeau, speaking on missing and murdered Indigenous women in front of Parliament in Ottawa, 2016
- Participants: 1,484 family members and survivors (testimony); 83 experts, knowledge-keepers, and officials (testimony); 819 other individuals (artistic expressions)
- Budget: Total: $53.8 m CAD; Funding: Government of Canada
- Duration: September 1, 2016 – June 3, 2019
- Website: https://www.mmiwg-ffada.ca/

The National Inquiry into Missing and Murdered Indigenous Women and Girls was a Canadian public inquiry from 2016 to 2019 that studied the Missing and Murdered Indigenous Women crisis.

The study included reviews of law enforcement documents as well as community hearings and testimonies.

The final report of the inquiry concluded that the high level of violence directed at Indigenous women and girls in Canada (First Nations, Inuit, Métis or FNIM women and girls) is "caused by state actions and inactions rooted in colonialism and colonial ideologies." It also concluded that the crisis constituted an ongoing "race, identity and gender-based genocide."

At the beginning of the inquiry, the proceedings were called the National Inquiry into Missing and Murdered Indigenous Women (MMIW). By the time the report was published, the crisis was also being called Missing and Murdered Indigenous Women and Girls (MMIWG) and Missing and Murdered Indigenous Relatives (MMIR).

== Planning ==
After the 2015 Canadian federal election, the Liberal Government under Prime Minister Justin Trudeau upheld their campaign promise and announced the initiation of a national public inquiry on December 8, 2015.

The inquiry was established as independent from the Government of Canada, and five commissioners were appointed to oversee the independent inquiry process: Marion Buller (chief commissioner), Michèle Audette, Qajaq Robinson, Marilyn Poitras, and Brian Eyolfson.

From December 2015 through February 2016, the government held pre-inquiry meetings with a variety of people including families, front-line workers, representatives of the provinces and Indigenous organizations, in order to determine how to structure the inquiry.

The mandate and projected length of time of the inquiry were published on August 3, 2016. In addition to the inquiry's estimated cost of CA$53.8 million, the government announced $16.17 million over four years to create family information liaison units in each province and territory.

In February 2017, the National Family Advisory Circle, which included family members of missing and murdered Indigenous women and girls from across Canada, was formed to help guide the inquiry.

An interim report was expected from the inquiry in November 2017. The initial conclusion date for the inquiry was set as December 31, 2018; however, on June 5, 2018, the federal government announced the extension of the National Inquiry by six months.

== Data gathering (2017-2018) ==
Statements for the inquiry were gathered from across Canada from May 2017 to December 2018.

After a pre-formal public hearing (meant as a "truth-gathering" advisory meeting) in April 2017, complaints by observers began to arise about the inquiry's terms of reference, its composition and administration, and a perceived lack of transparency.

Community hearings were the first part of the inquiry's "truth-gathering process" taking place from May 31, 2017, to April 8, 2018, in 15 locations across Canada. Evidence was taken from 50 witnesses during the first hearings over three days in May 2017 at Whitehorse, Yukon.

In July 2017, the Assembly of First Nations asked the federal government to reset the inquiry, revisit its mandate, and extend its timeline to allow more data gathering.

Throughout 2017, a number of key staffers left the inquiry. For instance, executive director Michèle Moreau announced in June that she would leave her position at the end of July. Marilyn Poitras resigned as a commissioner in July as well, saying in her resignation letter to the Prime Minister:

It is clear to me that I am unable to perform my duties as a commissioner with the process designed in its current structure ... I believe this opportunity to engage community on the place and treatment of Indigenous women is extremely important and necessary. It is time for Canada to face this relationship and repair it.

On August 8, 2017, Waneek Horn-Miller, the inquiry's director of community relations, stepped down, and on October 8 that year, CBC News reported that the Inquiry's lead lawyer and research director had also resigned.

On November 1, 2017, the inquiry published its interim report, titled "Our Women and Girls are Sacred". In October 2018, the Inquiry announced the last of its public hearing dates, following which the commissioners would write a final report and submit recommendations to the Canadian government by April 30, 2019.

Inquiry Truth-Gathering Process
Part	Period	Focus
1	May 31, 2017 – April 8, 2018	Community Hearings
2a	August 2017	Knowledge Keeper and Expert Hearing (Indigenous Law)
2b	May–June 2018	Knowledge Keeper and Expert Hearings (Human Rights; Racism),
3	May–June 2018	Institutional Hearings (Government Services; Police Policies and Practices)
4	September–October 2018	Hearings (Colonial Violence; Criminal Justice System, Family and Child Welfare; Sexual Exploitation)

== Final report (June 3, 2019) ==
"Throughout this report, and as witnesses shared, we convey truths about state actions and inactions rooted in colonialism and colonial ideologies, built on the presumption of superiority, and utilized to maintain power and control over the land and the people by oppression and, in many cases, by eliminating them."

— Reclaiming Power and Place: The Final Report of the National Inquiry into Missing and Murdered Indigenous Women and Girls, p. 54

The final report, entitled "Reclaiming Power and Place: The Final Report of the National Inquiry into Missing and Murdered Indigenous Women and Girls", which consists of volumes 1a and 1b, was released on June 3, 2019. In Volume 1a, Chief Commissioner of the Inquiry Marion Buller said that the high level of violence directed at FNIM women and girls is "caused by state actions and inactions rooted in colonialism and colonial ideologies."

In preparation for the final report and to fulfill their mandate, the Commission held numerous gatherings and 24 hearings across Canada, collected statements from 750 people, held institutional visits in 8 correctional facilities, led four Guided Dialogues, and held 8 validation meetings. In 15 community hearings, there were 468 family members and survivors of violence and, overall, 2,380 people participated. There were "147 private, or in-camera, sessions" where more than "270 family members and survivors shared their stories." There were 819 people whose creative artistic expressions "became part of the National Inquiry's Legacy Archive". The Inquiry also indicates that "84 Expert Witnesses, Elders and Knowledge Keepers, front-line workers, and officials provided testimony in nine Institutional and Expert and Knowledge Keeper Hearings."

The final report was altered without public notification after CBC identified certain factual errors.

=== Forensic Document Review Project (FDRP) ===
Families who gave testimonies to the National Inquiry expressed overwhelming concern that police investigations were "flawed" and that police services "had failed in their duty to properly investigate the crimes committed against them or their loved ones." In response, the Forensic Document Review Project (FDRP) was established to review "police and other related institutional files." There were two FDRP teams: one for Quebec and one for the rest of Canada. The second team subpoenaed 28 police forces, issued 30 subpoenas, reviewed 35 reports, and obtained and analyzed 174 files consisting of 136,834 documents representing 593,921 pages.

The most significant findings identified by the FDRP were:

1. There is no "reliable estimate of the numbers of missing and murdered Indigenous women, girls, and 2SLGBTQQIA persons in Canada."
2. The 2014 and 2015 Royal Canadian Mounted Police (RCMP) reports on MMIWG identified "narrow and incomplete causes of homicides of Indigenous women and girls in Canada."
3. The "often-cited statistic that Indigenous men are responsible for 70% of murders of Indigenous women and girls is not factually based."
4. "Virtually no information was found with respect to either the numbers or causes of missing and murdered Métis and Inuit women and girls and Indigenous 2SLGBTQQIA persons."
5. "Indigenous communities, particularly in remote areas, are under-prioritized and under-resourced."
6. "There is a lack of communication to families and Indigenous communities by police services and a lack of trust of the police by Indigenous communities."
7. "There continues to be a lack of communication with and coordination between the police and other service agencies."
8. "Deaths and disappearances of Indigenous women, girls, and 2SLGBTQQIA people are marked by indifference. Specifically, prejudice, stereotypes, and inaccurate beliefs and attitudes about Indigenous women, girls, and 2SLGBTQQIA persons negatively influence police investigations, and therefore death and disappearances are investigated and treated differently from other cases."

=== Calls for Justice ===
The final report issued 231 "Calls for Justice" to end violence against Indigenous women, girls, and 2SLGBTQQIA people. The report stated that these recommendations were legal imperatives under international human rights law. The calls were directed variously at governments, institutions, industry, and all Canadians.

Section 2 ("Calls for Justice for All Governments: Culture") calls upon governments to:

- Acknowledge Indigenous Peoples' inherent right to their culture
- Recognize Indigenous languages as official languages
- Make funds available to support the restoration of Indigenous cultures
- Create educational opportunities that incorporate Indigenous language
- Educate the general public and those within social services about Anti-Racism and Anti-Sexism and implement social movements based on confronting stereotypes
- Support the increase in representation of Indigenous Peoples in media

==== Children and Youth ====
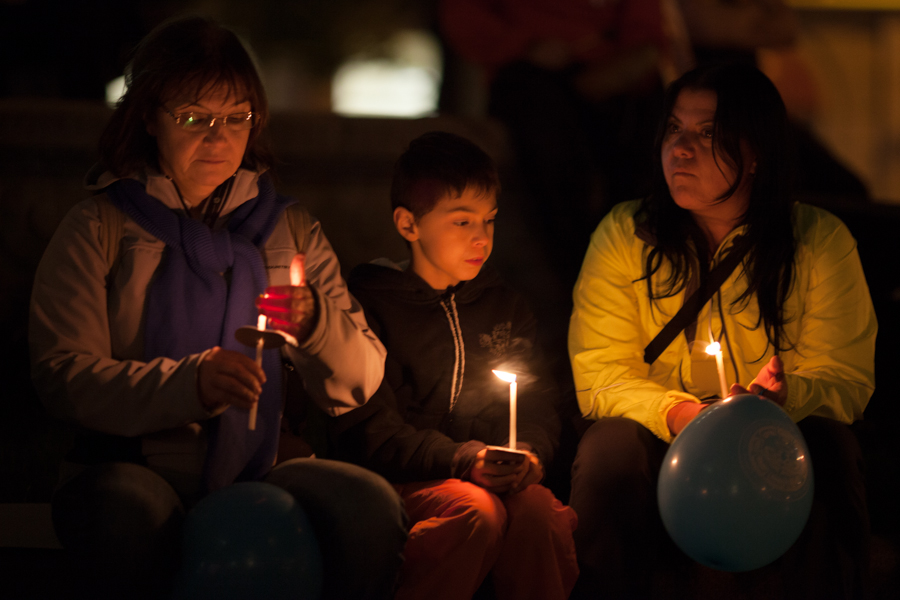
Participants at a MMIW event, 2013

A number of the "Calls for Justice" relate specifically to children and youth.

Sections 12.5 to 12.10 of the "Call for Social Workers and Those Implicated in Child Welfare" introduce the themes of financial support, welfare services, access to their culture, and advocacy.

- Provide financial support of resources and specialized care provided by the government to family or community members of missing children and murdered Indigenous women
- Child welfare services will ensure a family member or close friend will care for Indigenous children. The new caregivers then receive financial support equal to the amount of a foster family.
- All levels of government must ensure that Indigenous children have access to culture and language programs that align with their cultures
- Provincial and territorial governments urged to put a halt to the culturally based targeted practice of taking away Indigenous children from mothers/families by the state via birth alerts and putting them in the welfare system due to Eurocentric values
- Final report states that within one year, advocacy and accountability need to be addressed for Indigenous children and youth. Recommend that each jurisdiction appoint a Child and Youth Advocate
- The immediate adoption of Canadian Human Rights Tribunal 2017 CHRT 14 to implement Jordan's Principle by federal, provincial and territorial governments in regards to all First Nations, Métis, and Inuit children.

==== A call for all Canadians ====
Section 15 calls for participation from all Canadians. Within the eight subsections, it establishes that these are actions that are taken by citizens and not the state. This includes places such as the home, the workplace, and the classroom. Some of the actions listed in Section 15 that can be carried out by Canadians include:

- Speaking out against violence against Indigenous women, girls, and 2SLGBTQQIA people
- Acknowledging and celebrating Indigenous peoples' history, cultures, pride, and diversity
- Reading and understanding the final report itself and acknowledge the land lived upon
- Allowing for Indigenous girls and women to generate their individual self-determined solutions.

=== Resource extraction and MMIW ===
Chapter seven of The Final Report found that, "There is substantial evidence of a serious problem demonstrated in the correlation between resource extraction and violence against Indigenous women, girls, and 2SLGBTQQIA people. Work camps, or 'man camps,' associated with the resource extraction industry are implicated in higher rates of violence against Indigenous women at the camps and in the neighbouring communities." The report also found that Indigenous women did not have equitable access to the economic benefits of resource extraction.

=== Canadian "genocide of Indigenous Peoples" ===
"The truths shared in these National Inquiry hearings tell the story – or, more accurately, thousands of stories – of acts of genocide against Indigenous women, girls, and 2SLGBTQQIA people."

— Reclaiming Power and Place: The Final Report of the National Inquiry into Missing and Murdered Indigenous Women and Girls, p. 50

The National Inquiry commissioners said in the report and publicly that the MMIWG crisis is "a Canadian genocide." Moreover, the chief commissioner, Marion Buller, said there is an ongoing "deliberate, race, identity and gender-based genocide."

The MMIWG inquiry report cited the work of Raphael Lemkin (1900–1959), who coined the term genocide and who considered colonization intimately connected with genocide. Lemkin had explained that genocide does not exclusively mean the "immediate destruction of a nation", but signifies "a coordinated plan of different actions aiming at the destruction of essential foundations of the life of national groups, with the aim of annihilating the groups themselves."

The MMIWG inquiry used a broader definition of genocide from the Crimes Against Humanity and War Crimes Act which encompasses "not only acts of commission, but 'omission' as well." The inquiry described the traditional legal definition of genocide as "narrow" and based on the Holocaust. According to the inquiry, "colonial genocide does not conform with popular notions of genocide as a determinate, quantifiable event" and concluded that "these [genocidal] policies fluctuated in time and space, and in different incarnations, are still ongoing."

A supplemental report of the "Canadian genocide of Indigenous Peoples according to the legal definition of 'genocide,' was announced in Reclaiming Power and Place by the National Inquiry because of its gravity.

On June 3, 2019, Luis Almagro, secretary-general of Organization of American States (OAS), asked Foreign Affairs Minister Chrystia Freeland to support the creation of an independent probe into the MMIWG allegation of Canadian 'genocide' since Canada had previously supported "probes of atrocities in other countries" such as Nicaragua in 2018. On June 4, in Vancouver, Prime Minister Justin Trudeau said that, "Earlier this morning, the national inquiry formally presented their final report, in which they found that the tragic violence that Indigenous women and girls have experienced amounts to genocide."

On June 9, Conservative Party Leader Andrew Scheer attacked the use of the word genocide, saying, "I believe that the tragedy that has happened to this vulnerable section of our society is its own thing. I don't believe it falls into the category, to the definition of genocide."

== Sources ==
- Forge, John (2012). Designed to Kill: The Case Against Weapons Research. Springer. ISBN 978-9400757356.
- Moses, A. Dirk (2004). Moses, A. Dirk (ed.). Genocide and Settler Society: Frontier Violence and Stolen Indigenous Children in Australian History. Berghahn Books. ISBN 978-1571814104.
