= Andrew Woolford =

Canadian sociologist

Andrew Woolford is a sociology professor at the University of Manitoba and a former president of the International Association of Genocide Scholars. His research focuses on genocide studies, particularly cultural destruction of Indigenous Peoples. He has held various academic positions and received numerous awards for his contributions to genocide scholarship.

== Research ==
Woolford has made contributions in various domains related to human rights and restorative justice. His research studies settler colonialism and critical indigenous genocide issues, and connections between ecocidal and genocidal harm. He has been a vocal critic of genocide denialism, highlighting the dangers of denying genocides, emphasizing the importance of acknowledging and confronting these atrocities in order to prevent them from happening again.

He authored "The Idea of a Human Rights Museum," the first book that delves into the development of the Canadian Museum for Human Rights. This book places the museum within the context of other institutions globally that focus on human rights and social justice. It features essays from various scholars across disciplines such as law, cultural studies, and sociology, discussing the educational potential and challenges of human rights museums. The book is part of the University of Manitoba Press's Human Rights and Social Justice Series, which examines fundamental rights and freedoms owed to all individuals.

Another major work by Woolford is "The Politics of Restorative Justice: A Critical Introduction," where he, alongside Amanda Nelund, revisits restorative justice and its political implications. The second edition expands on the intersections of various injustices with restorative practices, emphasizing the legislative failure to address injustices adequately.

In "Canada and Colonial Genocide," Woolford critiques the narrative that portrays Canadian settler colonialism as compared to other forms globally. This work challenges the historical myth and engages with recent discussions spurred by the Truth and Reconciliation Commission's findings. It examines multiple acts of Canadian genocide of indigenous peoples, such as residential schools and ecological destruction, while also comparing them to other colonial contexts.

Woolford's work on "Symbiotic Victimization and Destruction" proposes legal recognition of non-human entities, specifically evidencing how natural and cultural entities are interconnected. This highlights a gap in genocide studies that has largely focused on human experiences while overlooking the intertwined relationship between humans and their environments. Woolford introduces concepts like "symbiotic destruction" to understand these interconnections better.

In examining Indigenous boarding schools in "This Benevolent Experiment: Indigenous Boarding Schools, Genocide, and Redress in Canada and the United States," he critiques the historical notion of these schools as a solution to the "Indian problem. " His comparison between the U. S. and Canada reveals varying responses to the harms inflicted by such institutions.

Another important contribution is "Colonial Genocide in Indigenous North America," a compilation of essays that broaden the understanding of genocide to reflect on colonial efforts against Indigenous peoples. It discusses the impacts of various forms of violence, such as forced assimilation and systematic destruction of communities.

== See also ==
- List of Canadian historians
