= Racism in Canada =

Racism in Canada traces both historical and contemporary racist community attitudes, as well as governmental negligence and political non-compliance with United Nations human rights standards and incidents in Canada. Moreover, racial capitalism is embedded in the very foundations of contemporary Canada, which is the product of indigenous First Nations combined with multiple waves of immigration, predominantly from Europe and in the modern era, from Asia.

== Statistics ==
Although Canada is often portrayed as a tolerant and inclusive society, racism has remained a persistent issue. In 2021, the Social Progress Index ranked Canada 6th globally for overall tolerance and inclusion. Earlier international surveys, including the 2013 World Values Survey, also placed Canada among the world’s most racially tolerant countries.

Despite these positive indicators, Canadian data shows ongoing racial inequities in employment, policing, and justice, as well as rising levels of hate-motivated violence. In 2020, an Ipsos poll found that 60% of Canadians considered racism a serious problem and believed systemic racism exists in Canada. Nearly half of respondents (48%) stated that major institutions, including government, police, courts, education, and media, tolerate racism.

Data from the Canadian Human Rights Commission indicates that systemic racism continues to affect institutions across the country. In 2016, one quarter of discrimination grievances received by the Commission involved race, colour, national or ethnic origin, or religion. Racialized Canadians earn approximately 81 cents for every dollar earned by non-racialized Canadians, and Black men in Toronto are three times more likely to be asked for identification by police. Employers remain 40% more likely to interview applicants with English-sounding names despite identical qualifications. Indigenous peoples are heavily overrepresented in federal correctional institutions, accounting for 27% of the prison population while comprising only 4.1% of the national population. In Quebec, applicants with Francophone-sounding names are 60% more likely to receive interview callbacks than equally qualified candidates with names associated with other ethnic backgrounds.

In 2017, 43% of police-reported hate crimes in Canada were motivated by racial or ethnic bias. Of these, 16% targeted Black individuals, 17% targeted Muslims, and 18% targeted Jewish individuals. These trends have become more concerning during a period in which populist movements that deepen mistrust, forms of authoritarianism that promise belonging and strength, and openly fascist rhetoric have become increasingly prominent in many parts of the world.

=== Police-reported hate crime trends ===
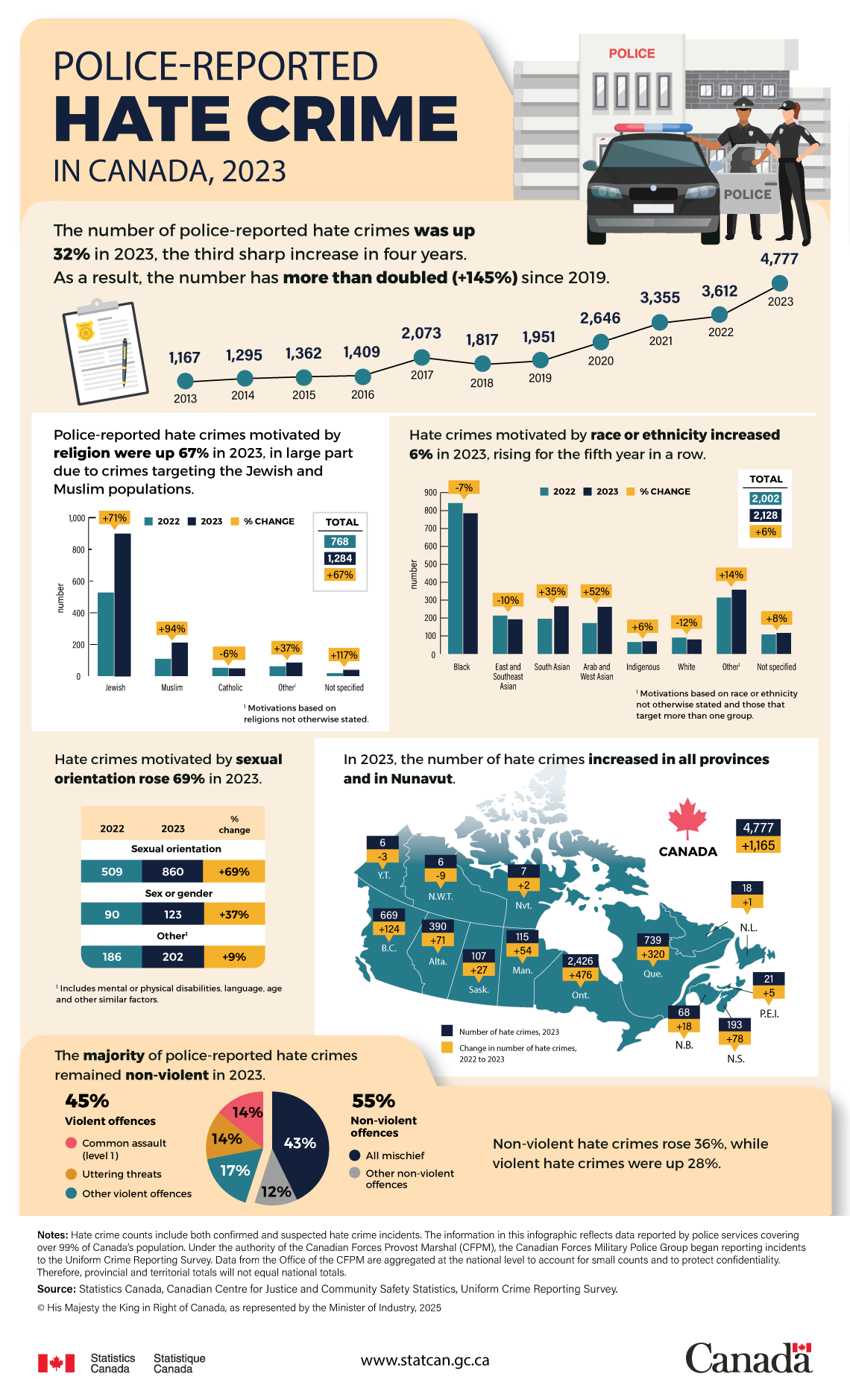

Police-reported hate crimes in Canada have risen significantly in recent years. In 2023, hate crimes increased by 32%, marking the third major rise in four years and representing a 145% increase since 2019.

Hate crimes motivated by race or ethnicity rose by 6% in 2023, with 2,128 reported cases. South Asian communities experienced a 35% increase, Arab and West Asian communities saw a 52% increase, and Indigenous peoples experienced a 6% increase. Incidents decreased for Black communities by 7% and for East and Southeast Asian communities by 10%.

Religiously motivated hate crimes grew by 67% in 2023. Incidents targeting Jewish communities increased by 71%, and incidents targeting Muslims increased by 94%. Anti-Catholic incidents declined by 6%, and total religion-based hate crimes reached 1,284 cases.

Every province and Nunavut recorded increases in police-reported hate crimes in 2023. Ontario reported the highest number with 2,426 incidents, an increase of 476 from the previous year. Quebec recorded 739 incidents and British Columbia recorded 669.

Most police-reported hate crimes in 2023 were non-violent, representing 55% of all cases. Non-violent hate crimes increased by 36%, while violent incidents rose by 28%.

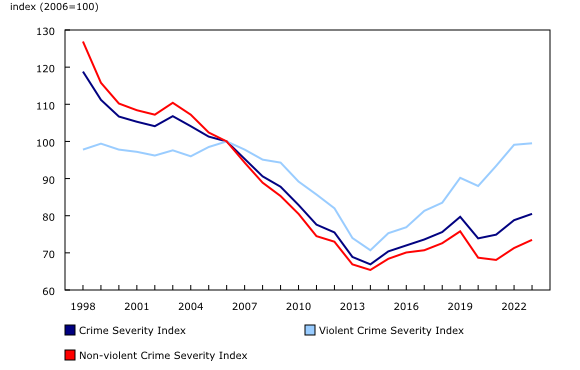
Police-reported Crime Severity Indexes, 1998 to 2023, index

== Overview ==
Canadian author and journalist Terry Glavin argues that Canada’s history of racism and racialisation remains deeply embedded in society in ways that parallel the racial divisions seen in the United States. He points to several examples of systemic racialisation that remained visible well into the late 1960s. He also claims that Canadians have traditionally identified through hyphenated white identities rather than calling themselves “white,” although cultural shifts around 2017, shaped partly by developments in the United States, have politically activated more Canadians to treat “whiteness” as a meaningful identity marker. Canada often brands itself globally as socially diverse, tolerant, and culturally open, particularly when compared to countries such as the United Kingdom or the United States, but this moralistic positioning has also made it easier for Canada to overlook and disengage from confronting long-standing and emerging forms of racism that reinforce racial inequities. This built-in self-protective firewall in the architecture, by de facto means, aids in preserving supremacy and privileges of the white European settlers in the society and institutions; it holds the line for them and perpetuates lived inequities for others. Conditions faced by many First Nations communities even in the 21st century, including lack of clean water and overcrowded, unsafe housing, illustrate these inequities. False perceptions of inclusion and "colour-blindness" have also been challenged in recent years by scholars such as Constance Backhouse, who argue that white supremacy remains prevalent in Canadian institutions. According to some commentators, racism in Canada contributes to a self-perpetuating cycle of criminalization and imprisonment. In 2019, the English and Art departments at Kwantlen Polytechnic University held an exhibition titled Maple-Washing: A Disruption, which used art and historical interpretation to challenge sanitized narratives of Canadian history.

=== Indigenous peoples ===
Throughout the history of Canada, the Canadian government, its colonial predecessors, and European settlers perpetrated systematic violence against Indigenous peoples that increasingly has been described as genocide and cultural genocide. The treatment has also been described as ethnic cleansing and crimes against humanity. These collective actions included forced displacement, land dispossession, medical segregation, deliberate starvation policies, nutrition experiments, physical violence, and compulsory cultural assimilation programs.

=== Slavery of Aboriginals and Black Canadians ===
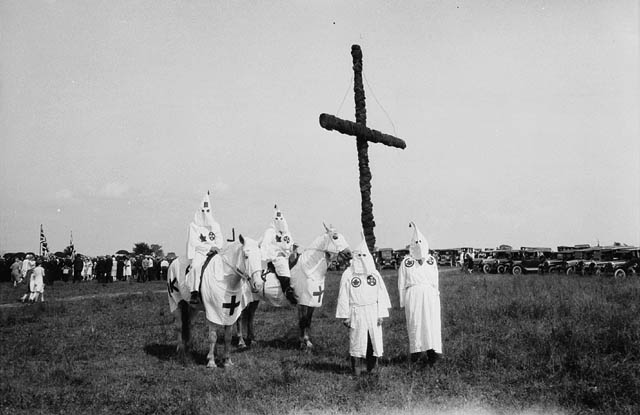
Ku Klux Klan members, on foot and horseback, by a cross erected in a field near Kingston, Ontario, in 1927

There are records of slavery in some areas of British North America, which later became Canada, dating from the 17th century. The majority of these slaves were Aboriginal, and United Empire Loyalists brought slaves with them after leaving the United States.

=== Segregation and Ku Klux Klan ===
Canada had also practiced segregation, and a Canadian Ku Klux Klan exists. Racial profiling occurs in cities such as Halifax, Toronto and Montreal. Black people made up 3% of the Canadian population in 2016, and 9% of the population of Toronto (which has the largest communities of Caribbean and African immigrants). They lived disproportionately in poverty, were three times as likely to be carded in Toronto than Whites, and incarceration rates for Blacks were climbing faster than for any other demographic. A Black Lives Matter protest was staged at Toronto Police Headquarters in March 2016.

=== Order-in-Council P.C. 1911-1324 ===
On August 12, 1911, the Governor General in Council approved a one-year prohibition of black immigration to Canada because, according to the Order-in-Council, "the Negro race" was "unsuitable to the climate and requirements of Canada." It was tabled on June 2, 1911, by the Minister of the Interior, Frank Oliver, following mounting pressure from white prairie farmers who were discontented with an influx in the immigration of black farmers from the United States. It was never officially enforced or added to the Immigration Act, likely because the government—led by Prime Minister Wilfrid Laurier—was hesitant to alienate black voters ahead of the 1911 federal election. It was repealed later that year.

=== Africville ===
In Nova Scotia, a community which mainly consisted of Black Canadians were forcibly removed and eventually razed between 1964 and 1967 after years of intentional neglect by the government in Halifax. The historic Black community had long faced systemic discrimination, including denial of basic services, discriminatory zoning, and exposure to environmental hazards. Beginning in the mid 1800s, provincial laws permitted segregated Black schools that were chronically underfunded, poorly staffed, and often lacked proper facilities, forcing many families to rely on improvised “kitchen schools.” School segregation laws in Ontario were formally repealed in 1964, with the last segregated school closing in 1965, and Nova Scotia dismantled its segregated districts more gradually throughout the 1960s. When the Halifax community was cleared, families were relocated using city dump trucks and the demolition erased a neighbourhood that had existed since the early 1800s. It is an example of Black rural spaces being treated discriminatorily, unlike white rural spaces, which are celebrated and protected as sites of “original” settlers.

== Legal, social, and institutional dimensions ==
=== Laws and the legal system ===
Canadian legal and institutional structures have historically incorporated white supremacist thinking and biological racism. Legal scholar Constance Backhouse has documented how explicit forms of racism were created and enforced through Canadian law into the 20th century. Canadian law formally uses the term "visible minority" to refer to people of colour (excluding Aboriginal peoples), a definition introduced in the Employment Equity Act of 1995. However, the UN Committee on the Elimination of Racial Discrimination has criticized this term, suggesting it may be considered offensive or inadequate by certain minority groups, and has recommended its reassessment. Over time, particularly after the Second World War and the Holocaust, scholars such as Franz Boas and Gunnar Myrdal exposed race as a social construct, and international human rights instruments, including 1950's UNESCO Statement on Race, which formally rejected the biological concept of race and called it a “social myth” responsible for immense global suffering, helped to dismantle some of Canada’s legal racial barriers. Historically, Canadian laws and regulations have targeted various racial and ethnic groups, including the Chinese Immigration Act of 1885, the Jewish admissions quota at McGill University, and legal actions against Chinese Canadians, as seen in the Hansard record of the Chinese Canadian Recognition and Restitution Act.

=== Social fracture ===
Racism in Canada continues to undermine the foundations of belonging, with 45% of racialized Canadians in 2023/2024 reporting that they experienced discrimination within the past five years. These experiences are not only linked to increased rates of poor mental health and reduced life satisfaction, but also to a deeper damage to social cohesion. Racism limits trust in others, erodes confidence in the fairness of society, and leaves individuals feeling disconnected, alienated, and fundamentally excluded from full participation in Canadian life. Among those affected, only 38% of racialized Canadians in 2023 said they felt warmly toward fellow Canadians, and nearly one in five reported having no faith in how Canadian democracy works. These figures are more than twice as high as those reported by non-victims, indicating a serious erosion of civic trust and a growing fracture in collective belonging.

Furthermore, racism continues to shape how racialized Canadians view their position in society. Around half of those who experienced racism believed that their race had negatively influenced their life chances, such as access to opportunities or fair treatment. This demonstrates that the consequences of systemic racialisation are not limited to individual distress but extend into long-term disillusionment with fairness, equal opportunity, and one’s rightful place in society. In 2025, it was reported that 45 to 50 percent of racialized Canadians had experienced racism in the previous five years, and 3 out of 10 of these individuals reported facing repeated incidents. Together, these patterns may contribute to a diminished sense of belonging among racialized individuals, whose daily lives are affected by the ongoing and cumulative effects of widespread racism.

== Community-specific racism ==
=== Greek-Canadians ===
The 1918 Toronto anti-Greek riot was a three-day race riot in Toronto, Ontario, Canada, targeting Greek immigrants during August 2–4, 1918. It was the largest riot in the city's history and one of the largest anti-Greek riots in the world.

=== Jewish Canadians ===
Antisemitism in Canada is hostility, prejudice or discrimination directed at Canadian Jews or Judaism as a religious, ethnic or racial group. For much of the country's history it was not confined to extremists: it was voiced in Parliament and the press, taught in some schools and churches, and written into immigration policy, university admissions and property deeds.

=== Black people ===
Black Canadians are discriminated against in Canada.

=== Asian Canadians ===
==== Chinese Canadians ====
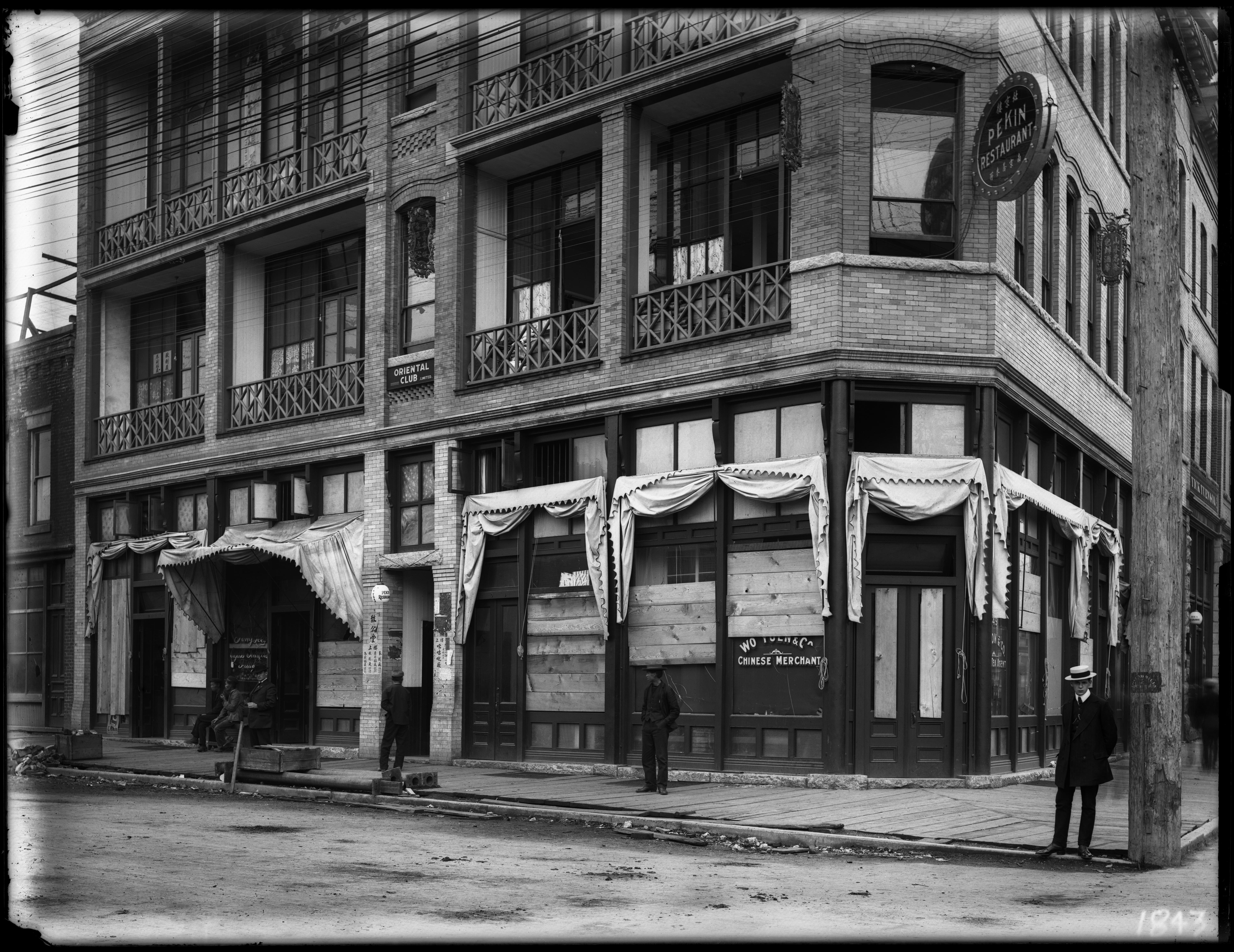
Boarded windows and storefronts on Pender Street in Chinatown after the September 1907 riots

Starting in 1858, Chinese "coolies" were brought to Canada to work in British Columbia in the mines and on the Canadian Pacific Railway. After anti-Chinese riots broke out in 1886, a "Chinese head tax" was implemented to curtail immigration from China. In 1907, the Anti-Oriental Riots in Vancouver targeted Chinese and Japanese-owned businesses, and the Asiatic Exclusion League was formed to drive Asians out of the province. League members attacked Asians, resulting in numerous riots. In 1923, the federal government passed the Chinese Immigration Act, commonly known as the Exclusion Act, prohibiting most Chinese immigration. The Act was repealed in 1947, but discrimination limiting non-European immigrants continued until 1967 when a points-based system was introduced to assess immigrants regardless of origin.

==== Japanese Canadians ====
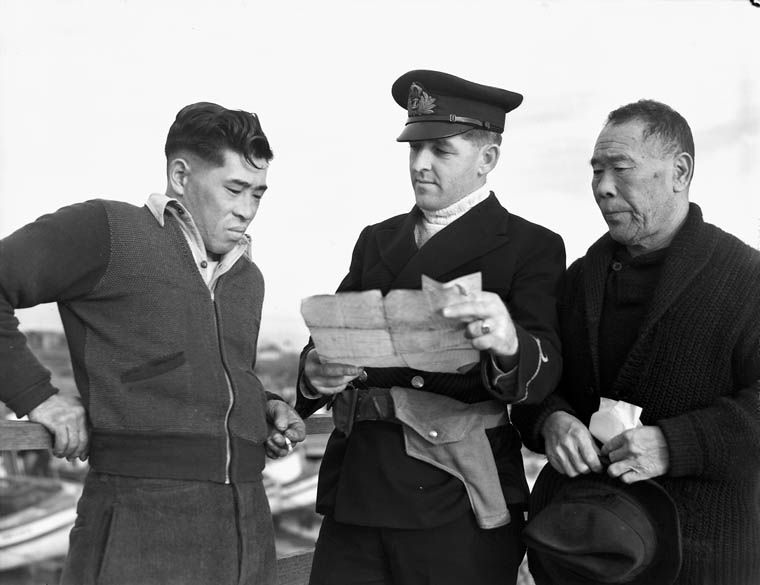
A Royal Canadian Navy officer questions Canadian fishermen of Japanese descent as their boats were confiscated.

Although a British–Japanese treaty guaranteed Japanese citizens freedom of travel, they were nevertheless subject to anti-Asian racism in Canada, though a slightly lesser degree at the time than the Chinese before World War II, as an informal agreement between the Japanese and Canadian governments limited Japanese immigration in the wake of the Vancouver anti-Asian riots.

In 1942, during World War II, many Canadians of Japanese heritage—even those born in Canada— were forcibly moved to internment camps under the authority of the War Measures Act. At first, many men were separated from their families and sent to road camps in Ontario and on the British Columbia–Alberta border. Small towns in the BC interior such as Greenwood, Sandon, New Denver and Slocan became internment camps for women, children and the aged. To stay together, Japanese–Canadian families chose to work in farms in Alberta and Manitoba. Those who resisted and challenged the orders of the Canadian government were rounded up by the Royal Canadian Mounted Police and incarcerated in a barbed-wire prisoner-of-war camp in Angler, Ontario. Japanese–Canadians fishing boats were also seized, with plans to drastically reduce fishing licenses from them and forcibly redistribute them for white Canadians. With government promises to return the land and properties seized during that time period, Japanese Canadians left their homes. This turned out to be untrue, as the seized possessions were resold and never returned to the Japanese Canadians. Unlike prisoners of war, who were protected by the Geneva Convention, Japanese–Canadians were forced to pay for their own internment.

==== South Asian Canadians ====
In recent years, South Asian Canadians—particularly those of Indian descent—have faced increasing levels of racial discrimination both online and in public spaces. Verbal attacks often invoke stereotypes about hygiene, language, food or accusations of "overpopulating" Canada. These forms of racism have intensified amid growing anti-immigrant sentiment, particularly in the wake of the COVID-19 pandemic, and are often linked to public debates about international students, labour competition, and housing. South Asians have reported being told to "go back to your country," and have experienced cultural shaming of their food, clothing and accents. These forms of exclusion echo earlier instances of anti-South Asian racism in Canadian history, such as the rejection of Sikh passengers abroad the Komagata Maru in 1914, which reflected a broader effort to prevent Indian immigration to Canada.

In addition to external discrimination, some scholars have identified the persistence of colourism—a preference for lighter skin tones—as a form of internalized colonialism within South Asian communities. These beauty standards, shaped by global media and colonial histories, continue to affect how class, caste, and gender operate within diasporic experiences. These patterns are not only local, but part of broader global systems of racial capitalism, postcolonial migration, and transnational identity politics, which structure the lives of racialized communities across borders.

===== Sikhs =====
Anti-Sikh sentiment in Canada has a historical and contemporary presence marked by several key events and ongoing issues. Early instances include the 1907 Bellingham Race Riot, where South East Asian and South Asian immigrants, mostly Sikhs, were violently targeted by white mobs in Washington (state), spilling over into Canadian anti-immigrant sentiments and the Pacific Northwest.

The 1914 Komagata Maru incident further highlighted institutional racism when 376 British Indian passengers, mostly Sikhs, were denied entry into Canada and forced to return to India, where many faced persecution from colonial authorities.

Following the Air India Flight 182 attack, and more significantly after the September 11 attacks, Sikhs in Canada experienced increased xenophobia and hate crimes, often being perceived as security threats and mistaken for Muslims due to their turbans and beards.

== Contemporary issues ==
=== Missing and murdered Indigenous women ===
The representation of murdered Indigenous women in crime statistics is not proportionate to the general population. In 2006, Amnesty International researched racism specific to Indigenous women in Canada. They reported on the lack of basic human rights, discrimination, and violence against Indigenous women. The Amnesty report found that First Nations women (age 25–44) with status under the Indian Act were five times more likely than other women of the same age to die as a result of violence. In 2006, the documentary film Finding Dawn looked into the many missing and murdered Aboriginal women in Canada over the past three decades. In September 2016, in response to repeated calls from Indigenous groups, activists, and non-governmental organizations, the Government of Canada under Prime Minister Justin Trudeau, jointly with all provincial and territorial governments, established a national public inquiry into Missing and Murdered Indigenous Women and Girls.

Indigenous people still have to deal with racism within Canada and the challenges that the communities face are often ignored. There are still negative stereotypes associated with Indigenous people such as being freeloaders, drug addicts or dumb. Indigenous people are more likely to feel depression due to several factors such as poverty, loss of cultural identity, inadequate health care and more.

In 2020, the staff at a hospital in the Quebec city of Joliette were shown on video mocking and making racist remarks at an Atikamekw woman who eventually died. Indigenous leaders say the video exposes the grim realities of systemic racism that have long gone ignored or suppressed throughout Canada.

=== COVID-19 pandemic ===
In the midst of the COVID-19 pandemic, Asian Canadians reported increased incidents of violent assaults, especially against women of Asian descent. According to an Angus Reid survey from 22 June 2020, up to 50% of Chinese-Canadians had experienced verbal abuse, and 29% had been made to feel feared, as if they posed a threat to public safety. Another survey of 1,600 adults conducted by ResearchCo and obtained by the Agence France-Presse revealed one in four Canadians of Asian descent (70% of whom were of Chinese descent) who lived in British Columbia knew someone within their household who had faced discrimination. The survey also revealed 24 percent of Canadians of South Asian descent reported racist insults. Canadians of Indigenous origin had also reported discrimination.

== See also ==
- Racism in Quebec
- Neo-Nazism in Canada
- Fascism in Canada
- Ku Klux Klan in Canada
- Anti-Quebec sentiment
- Anti-Sikh sentiment in Canada
- Compulsory sterilization in Canada
- Continuous journey regulation
- COVID-19 racism
- Fascism in Canada
- Freedomites, zealous Spiritual Christians from Russia
- High Arctic relocation
- Highway of Tears murders
- Indian Health Transfer Policy (Canada)
- Indigenous food security in Canada
- Indigenous land claims in Canada
- Indigenous peoples and the Canadian criminal justice system
- Indigenous specific land claims in Canada
- Montreal experiments
- MV Sun Sea incident
- Nativism (politics)#Canada
- Numbered Treaties

== Sources ==
- Dhamoon, Rita Kaur (2016). "Re-presenting Genocide: The Canadian Museum of Human Rights and Settler Colonial Power". The Journal of Race, Ethnicity, and Politics. 1 (1): 5–30. doi:10.1017/rep.2015.4.
- Green, Sarah (23 August 2023). "The 'silent genocide' haunting Canada's liberal dream". The Daily Telegraph. Archived from the original on 13 July 2024.
- Lightfoot, Kent G.; Nelson, Peter A.; Grone, Michael A.; Apodaca, Alec (2021). "Pathways to Persistence: Divergent Native engagements with sustained colonial permutations in North America". In Panich, Lee M.; Gonzalez, Sara L. (eds.). The Routledge Handbook of the Archaeology of Indigenous-Colonial Interaction in the Americas. Routledge. pp. 129–146. ISBN 978-0-429-27425-1.
- MacDonald, David B. (2 October 2015). "Canada's history wars: indigenous genocide and public memory in the United States, Australia and Canada". Journal of Genocide Research. 17 (4): 411–431. doi:10.1080/14623528.2015.1096583.
- MacDonald, David B.; Hudson, Graham (2012). "The Genocide Question and Indian Residential Schools in Canada". Canadian Journal of Political Science. 45 (2): 427–449. doi:10.1017/s000842391200039x.
- Woolford, Andrew (2009). "Ontological Destruction: Genocide and Canadian Aboriginal Peoples". Genocide Studies and Prevention. 4 (1): 81–97. doi:10.3138/gsp.4.1.81.
