= Marion Buller =

Canadian judge

Marion R. Buller CM, is a First Nations jurist (retired), practising lawyer with Miller Titerle+Co. in British Columbia and current chancellor of the University of Victoria. Buller served as the Chief Commissioner for the National Inquiry into Missing and Murdered Indigenous Women and Girls from 2016 to 2019.

A member of Mistawasis First Nation, she was the first First Nations woman to be appointed to the Provincial Court of British Columbia in 1994, and presided in courts throughout B.C. She established the First Nations Courts of British Columbia in 2006 and provided the foundation for the Aboriginal Family Healing Court in 2016. Buller served as President of the Indigenous Bar Association and served as Director of the B.C. Law Court Society, B.C. Law Foundation, B.C. Police Commission and the B.C. Mediators Roster. Buller has lectured and written numerous articles and papers about Aboriginal law, criminal law, family law and human rights. She lives in Victoria, B.C.

== Career ==
Marion Buller attended the University of Victoria where she received a BA in Anthropology in 1975 and later graduated with her LLB in 1987. Buller’s career in law was nothing far from noteworthy; she was instrumental in facilitating several organizations regarding Indigenous rights, women’s rights, Aboriginal law, family law and human rights. From 1988-1994, Buller worked as a civil and criminal lawyer in British Columbia. In 1994, Buller was appointed to the Provincial Court bench, making her the first female Indigenous Judge in British Columbia. During her legal career, Buller worked as both president and director of Canada’s Indigenous Bar Association; a national nonprofit association of First Nations, Métis, and Inuit persons in Canada trained in the field of law. Membership includes judges, lawyers, political leaders, academics, articling and law students. She also has been an active member of several other organizations such as the B.C. Police Commission, the BC Mediators’ Roster, the Law Foundation of B.C. and the Law Courts Education Society - a nonprofit organization that provides educational programs and services regarding the justice system in Canada. Among the many other milestones mentioned of Buller’s career, in 2006, she was established the First Nations Court of British Columbia; a criminal sentencing court which uses restorative justice and traditional ways to reach balance and healing. Judge Buller also developed the foundation for the Aboriginal Family Healing Court, a Court to address the return of Indigenous children to their families. Buller has written notable papers and articles which highlighted the inconsistencies within the Justice System regarding Indigenous rights, women’s rights, Aboriginal law, etc. She was also Commission Counsel for the Cariboo-Chilcotin Justice Inquiry which examined the relationship between the Cariboo-Chilcotin people and the justice system.

In 2016, Buller retired from her position as Judge at the Provincial Court of British Columbia. After retirement she was appointed as Chief Commissioner for the National Inquiry into Missing and Murdered Indigenous Women and Girls, which examined the systemic causes of the MMIW crisis in Canada. As Chief Commissioner of the inquiry, Buller oversaw the writing of the inquiry's two-volume final report, Reclaiming Power and Place which examines the causes for the disturbing statistics of violence against Indigenous women, girls and 2SLGBTQQIA people in Canada.

In 2021, Buller was appointed as the 12th chancellor of the University of Victoria and subsequently began her term on January 1, 2022.

== National Inquiry into Missing and Murdered Indigenous Women and Girls ==
On December 8, 2015, the Liberal government announced the start of the National Inquiry into Missing and Murdered Indigenous Women and Girls. The inquiry was set to conclude at the end of 2018. However, Chief Commissioner Buller requested an extension to the inquiry. The final report released on June 3, 2019, concluded that the violence faced by Indigenous women and girls is caused by state action and inaction. Within the report, Commissioner Buller refers to this ongoing violence as a “deliberate, race, identity and gender-based genocide”. Among many criticisms of the inquiry was the refusal of the federal government to grant the full two year extension that was requested, which Buller saw as another “part of this national tragedy”.

== Awards ==
In 2012, Buller received the Distinguished Alumni Award from the University of Victoria Faculty of Social Science. In 2016, Maclean's listed her as one of only six people who might be especially influential on policy in the Trudeau government. Buller has received numerous other awards, including the Queen's Golden Jubilee which recognizes Canadians who demonstrate leadership and talent in performing and visual arts. She also received a Diamond Jubilee Medal which acknowledges Canadian citizens who have greatly contributed to the country and brought great credit to Canada. Marion Buller received the Rosemary Brown Award for Women. This award recognizes a British Columbia based woman who upholds the values and ideals of which Rosemary Brown did during her life. She also received the Vancouver YWCA Woman of Distinction Award for Reconciliation in Action. In 2021, Buller was granted a Doctor of Laws (h.c.) degree by Thompson Rivers University. In 2022, Buller was granted a Doctor of Laws (h.c.) degree by Lakehead University and was appointed to the Order of Canada.
