= Birth alert =

Medical practice in Canada

Birth alerts (or hospital alerts) was a practice in Canada, in which a social or health care worker notifies the staff of a hospital if they have concerns for the safety of an expected child based on their parents' history. This can include past instances of poverty, domestic violence, drug usage, and history with child welfare. A birth alert could also be issued if the mother had undergone frequent moves, or had been in the foster care system herself as a child. Birth alerts are typically issued without the parents' consent, and often result in apprehension and placement of the child into foster care after birth.

Birth alerts have been considered a controversial practice, as they have been disproportionately used for Indigenous children. The Indigenous rights group Idle No More considers birth alerts to be one of the major "hardships" faced by Canada's Indigenous community. In June 2019, the Final Report of the National Inquiry into Missing and Murdered Indigenous Women and Girls (MMIWG) recommended the abolishment of "the practice of targeting and apprehending infants (hospital alerts or birth alerts) from Indigenous mothers right after they give birth", as they were "racist and discriminatory and are a gross violation of the rights of the child, the mother, and the community."

Indigenous children have been targeted by social services and the foster care system being labeled as "high risk" for having been in the foster care system. The removal of Indigenous children has further contributed to cultural genocide and generational trauma experienced by Indigenous peoples in Canada. Many Indigenous women subjected to a Birth Alert describe feeling surveilled by social services, or inappropriately harassed by the institution throughout their pregnancy, causing distress, fear, and feelings of anxiety.

Following the release of the report, the practice of birth alerts was discontinued in multiple provinces in the years that followed. The last province to abolish this practice was Quebec in 2023. However, the abuse of Indigenous women in Canada's healthcare system, and furthermore the apprehension of Indigenous children immediately after birth has continued in an unofficial capacity across multiple provinces.

== Usage ==
=== Alberta ===
Alberta ended birth alerts in 2019. Mothers who are uncertain whether they were subjected to a birth alert or the information that led to that decision can make a freedom of information request.

=== British Columbia ===
In March 2018, the Supreme Court of British Columbia ordered that the Ministry of Children and Family Development (MCFD) return a child to their mother, and coordinate community support and supervision within the Huu-ay-aht First Nations. Under a birth alert, the child was apprehended after birth, with the mother only allowed limited visits. The court ruled that the MCFD violated the Child, Family and Community Service Act by not providing an adequate reason for the measure besides "her own mother's history with MCFD", and not providing the mother with advance notice of the decision.

In July 2019, following the MMIWG report, Minister of Children and Family Development Katrine Conroy suggested that the province was looking into its recommendations, explaining that "we know there are far too many Indigenous kids taken into care", and that "especially in the Indigenous communities, we are making sure there are more supports in place and working in partnership with the communities so that those children have the support they need – that the parents have the support they need."

In September 2019, Conroy announced that provincial health care providers and social service workers "will no longer share information about expectant parents without consent from those parents and will stop the practice of birth alerts." She emphasized that "moving to a voluntary approach of providing early supports and preventative services to expectant parents will help them plan and safely care for their babies."

However, eight months after the announced ban, ATPN news, an Indigenous outlet documented the removal of an Indigenous couple's second child without notice or warning, violating previous statements made by the MFCD. This had come after the removal of the couple's first child in 2019, just 90 minutes after the mothers cesarean birth. In a second instance in 2023, one Indigenous couple reached out to the MFCD in 2023 in hopes of gaining stable housing. After telling the MFCD that she did not feel safe in the East Hastings transition house which had been provided to her, in part given that she had no access to her family or support system, the MFCD informed the expectant mother and her partner that they were at risk of losing their child.

In 2026, a $66-million settlement was proposed in a BC class-action lawsuit for parents who were the subject of birth alerts.

=== Manitoba ===
On June 23, 2020, Manitoba announced that it would end birth alerts on June 30. Minister of Families Heather Stefanson stated that "our government believes that strong families are the cornerstone of our province and we understand that to strengthen our families we need to ensure they are supported by the community organizations that serve at-risk parents and children each and every day in our communities." Manitoba Child and Family Services would provide referrals to support programs such as Mount Carmel Clinic's Mothering Project—which concurrently received additional government funding to help double the program's capacity.

An article written by Kelly Malone for CBC claims that 339 babies were taken in 2021 alone, which demonstrates that the “ban” does not prevent racial profiling or apprehension of children over more sustainable or community based alternatives.

=== New Brunswick ===
In January 2021, New Brunswick's Ministry of Social Development stated that the province has been reviewing its use of birth alerts. The practice was ended in October 2021.

=== Newfoundland and Labrador ===
In January 2021, the provincial Ministry of Children, Seniors and Social Development stated that it was reviewing its use of birth alerts, consistent with the recommendations of the MMIWG inquiry and the Truth and Reconciliation Commission. Newfoundland and Labrador ended the use of birth alerts in June 2021.

=== Nova Scotia ===
Nova Scotia ended the use of birth alerts in November 2021.

=== Ontario ===
On July 14, 2020, Associate Minister of Children and Women's Issues Jill Dunlop directed Ontario's Children's Aid Societies to stop issuing birth alerts by October 15, 2020. Dunlop stated that "we're trying to work to collaborate with families. That families have a voice in their plans moving forward. And birth alerts just do the exact opposite."

However, since the Ontario ban in 2020, Quebec hospitals had sent almost 300 unacted upon birth alerts for Quebec residents giving birth in Ontario until their own ban in 2023, highlighting a severe lack of cross hospital communication regarding provincial policy which generates undue stress for Indigenous mothers as they are wrongly surveilled by social services.

=== Quebec ===
Birth alerts have been used in Quebec since 2009, and the use of birth alerts was abolished on April 14, 2023.

=== Prince Edward Island ===
On February 1, 2021, Prince Edward Island ended its use of birth alerts.

=== Saskatchewan ===
In January 2021, Saskatchewan announced that it would end its use of birth alerts on February 1, 2021.

=== Yukon ===
The Yukon last issued a birth alert in 2017, and ended the practice in 2019.

== See also ==
- Sixties Scoop
