= Ward (law) =

Person under protection of a legal guardian

In law, a ward is a minor or incapacitated adult placed under the protection of a legal guardian or government entity, such as a court. Such a person may be referenced as a "ward of the court".

== Historical wardship ==
Wardship is an ancient jurisdiction derived ultimately from feudal law. Among "feudal incidents" were:

- wardship of minor heirs of a tenant in chief;
- custody of idiots.

Wardship of minor heirs gave the right:

- to take temporary custody of the lands;
- to take custody of the ward;
- to decide the ward's marriage partner.

Such rights were sold to the highest bidder or granted as a favour. In 1535 Henry VIII sponsored the Statute of Uses to protect his income from wardship. In 1540 he established the Court of Wards and Liveries. The Court lost its function in 1646 with the abolition of feudal tenure in England and Wales. It was abolished in 1660.

== Modern wardship ==
As parens patriae ("parent of the nation"), the British Crown has a duty to protect its subjects, and particularly those unable to look after themselves. In the United Kingdom and other Commonwealth realms, the monarch as parens patriae is parent for all the children in their realms, who, if a judge so determines, can become wards of court. However, the House of Lords, in the case of Re F (Mental Patient: Sterilisation), held that the monarch has no parens patriae jurisdiction with regard to mentally disabled adults. A court may take responsibility for the legal protection of an incapacitated person (adult) as well as a minor, and the ward is known as a ward of the court or a ward of the state.

In Australia, New Zealand, and the United States, the child is termed a ward of the court. In Ireland and the United Kingdom, "the" is not used; the ward is thus termed a ward of court. In Canada, the legal term is permanent ward, except in Ontario, which uses the term Crown ward.

== Foster care ==
Children who are in the custody of government departments, also known as foster care, become wards of the respective government entity, and in the US they are wards of the states in which they reside. The government or state is in loco parentis to the child, which generally entails supporting the child and assuming all legal authority to make medical and legal decisions on the child's behalf.

== Canada ==
The indigenous peoples in Canada remain wards of the Crown as a result of Indian Act legislation. Some scholars and political organizations, such as the Assembly of First Nations, have argued that this represents an apartheid-like system of governance.

== France ==
In France, a ward of the State (pupille de l'État) is a minor who is under the responsibility of the State.

These wards could be the result of any of: anonymous birth ("né sous X"), found abandoned, unregistered children, children assigned by a court to the care of the Child Social Welfare Service (ASE), or minor orphans who suddenly find themselves without parents for whatever reason.

Children recognized as wards of the state are eligible for adoption, and continue to be wards until they are. Legal status of wards of the state in France are covered by law 224-4 of the Social Action and Family Code.

== United States ==
In the 1831 Supreme Court case Cherokee Nation v. Georgia, the native peoples were legally made to be wards of the state. One consequence of this was that they were not permitted to sue the US government because of their status as a dependent nation.

The Indian Appropriations Act was passed on 3 March 1871, with an amendment ending tribal recognition and the treaty system. All Indians were made wards of the state; thus the U.S. government no longer needed tribal consent in dealing with the tribes.

In California, a juvenile offender may be ordered to be a ward of a court if such juvenile violated any state law, curfew, or from excessive truancies since the juvenile criminal justice system in California is geared toward rehabilitation instead of punishment.

== See also ==
- Charge (youth)
- Godchild
- Court of Wards and Liveries
- Government involvement in the Terri Schiavo case
- History of the English fiscal system
- Proof of age inquisition
- Tenant-in-chief - relating to medieval feudal wardships
