= Mount Carmel Clinic =

Winnipeg community health center

Mount Carmel Clinic is a community health center in Winnipeg’s North End. It was founded in 1926.

The clinic was established by Jewish community there; Jews had immigrated to Winnipeg in the late 19th century and had contributed to building the city and its economy but were excluded from many aspects of society; they built the clinic to serve their medical needs.

Anne G. Ross joined the staff a nurse around 1950; she had been raised in the neighborhood. At the time the clinic had only two employees and was little-used. Over time she rose to become its executive director and led its transformation into a health center serving the needs of the local community.
