= Government in Halifax, Nova Scotia =

Halifax Regional Municipality

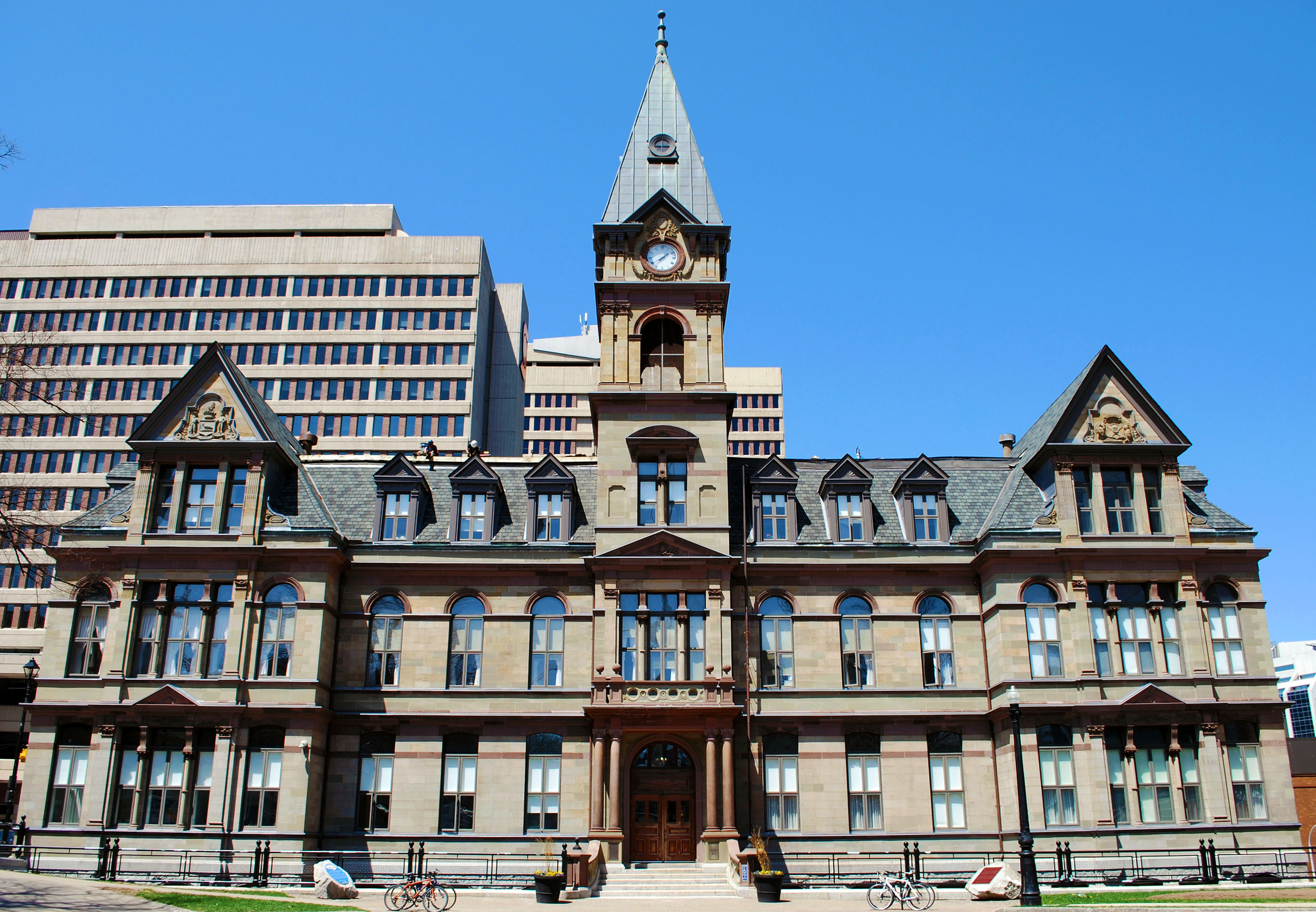

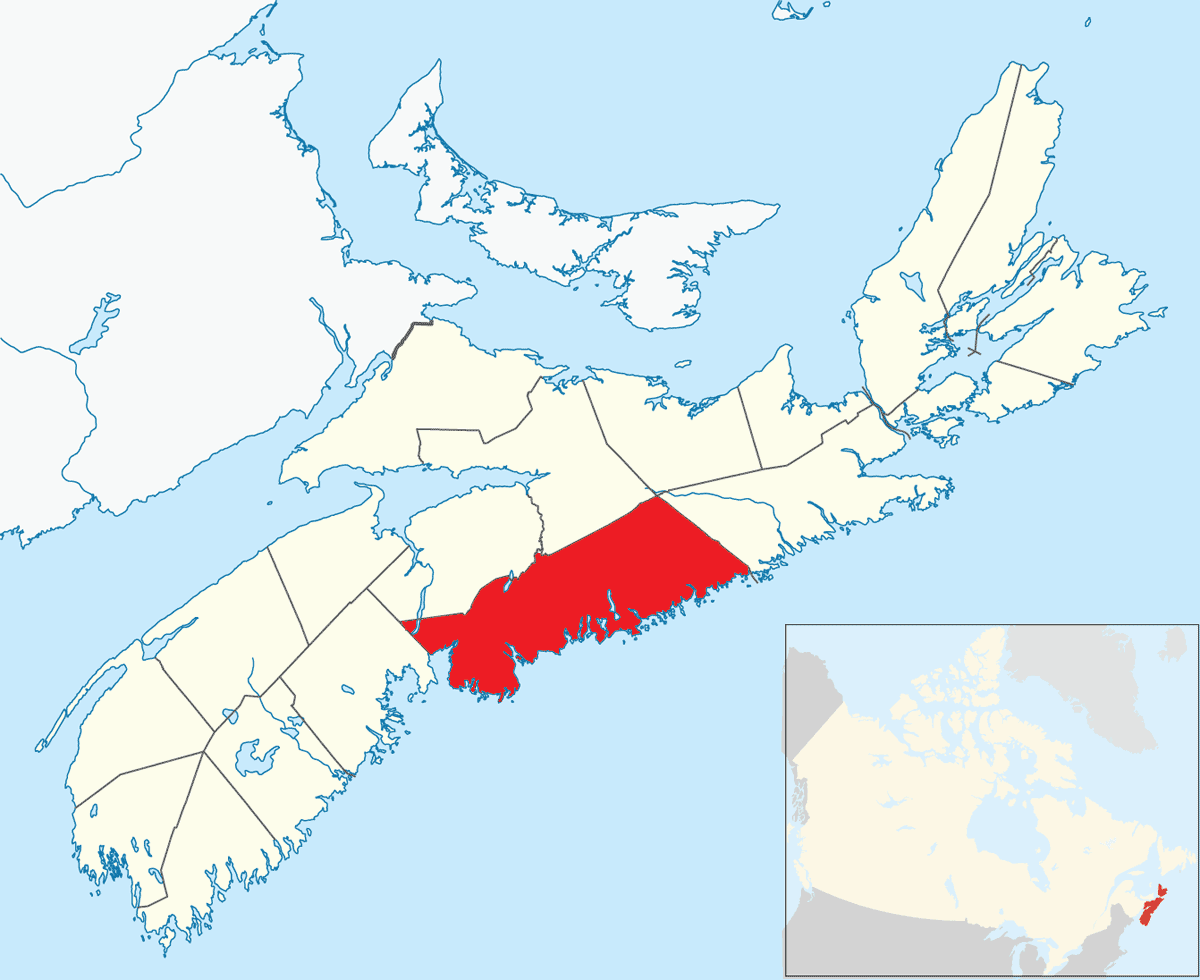
- Abbreviation: HRM
- Named after: George Montagu-Dunk, 2nd Earl of Halifax
- Merged into: 1996
- Formation: April 1, 1996; 30 years ago
- Merger of: City of Halifax; City of Dartmouth; Town of Bedford; County of Halifax
- Type: Municipal government
- Purpose: Municipal Government
- Headquarters: Halifax City Hall
- Location: 1841 Argyle Street; PO Box 1749; Halifax, Nova Scotia; B3J 3A5
- Mayor: Andy FIllmore
- Deputy Mayor: Patty Cuttell
- Chief Administrative Officer: Brad Anguish (*interim)
- Auditor General: Evangeline Colman-Sadd
- Subsidiaries: Halifax Regional Police; Halifax Public Libraries; Halifax Water
- Budget: (April–March)
- Revenue: $872,838,100 (2016/17)
- Website: halifax.ca

Halifax, formally known as the Halifax Regional Municipality, is located in Nova Scotia, Canada. The municipality is governed by a mayor (elected at large) and a sixteen-person Regional Council, who are elected by geographic district; municipal elections occur every leap year.

The Halifax Regional Council has also established smaller "Community Councils" wherein three or more councilors from a geographic area agree to form these councils to deal primarily with parks and local development issues. Many Community Council decisions are subject to final approval by Regional Council.

The Halifax Regional Council is directly responsible for the oversight of the operations of Halifax Regional Fire and Emergency, Halifax Transit, parks and recreation, public works and waste management. Regional Council also appoints Council members and citizens to external boards, agencies, and commissions, including the Board of Police Commissioners responsible for area Royal Canadian Mounted Police and Halifax Regional Police, Halifax Public Libraries, and the Halifax Regional Water Commission.

== Emergency services ==
Two areas of contention during the post-amalgamation years have been in the areas of police and fire services.

=== Police services ===
Halifax Regional Police is an amalgamation of the municipal forces from the City of Halifax, City of Dartmouth, and Town of Bedford. Areas that were formerly part of the Municipality of the County of Halifax were policed by the Royal Canadian Mounted Police (RCMP) under a provincial policing contract.

Since amalgamation, HRP has been restricted to patrolling the former cities of Halifax and Dartmouth, the Sambro loop and the town of Bedford, while the RCMP provide rural policing services as well as highway traffic enforcement. Jurisdictional boundaries have been relaxed in recent years, allowing more integration between both forces to allow for better coverage and response.

=== Fire services ===
Unlike policing services, Halifax Fire and Emergency (HRFE) is an amalgamation of all fire departments in Halifax County. This created some controversy in rural areas where predominantly volunteer fire companies were being stripped of equipment and trucks which local communities had fund-raised for during the pre-amalgamation period; this equipment was being relocated to service the urban core. This has since been halted, although there is still some tension between the professional paid HRFE members in the urban core and their volunteer rural counterparts.

== Municipal budget ==
Since its creation, rapid property value increases and new construction have resulted in HRM's budget growing to $589 million in 2005/06, up from $439 million in 1996. This has allowed HRM to proceed with major capital projects such as an extension of municipally-supplied water to Fall River, breaking ground on the new sewage treatment system (Harbour Solutions), and establishment of Metrolink, a bus rapid transit system.

== Federal representation ==
The Halifax Regional Municipality is represented by the following federal ridings:

Halifax Metropolitan Area

- Halifax
- Halifax West

Dartmouth Metropolitan Area

- Dartmouth—Cole Harbour

Bedford

- Halifax West

Rest of the municipality

- Halifax West
- Sackville—Eastern Shore
- Central Nova
- Cumberland—Colchester—Musquodoboit Valley
- South Shore—St. Margaret's

== Provincial representation ==
In the last three provincial elections over 50% of the population of HRM who voted, has voted for the provincial New Democratic Party (NDP), placing the region's voters outside the mainstream of provincial politics in outlying more rural areas which are split between a Liberal/Conservative voting pattern. It can be argued that HRM's recent voting pattern has actually placed the provincial (and federal) NDP or social democratic politics in general, into the political mainstream for the province. That being said, a majority of the people voted for the Liberals this past election.

== See also ==
- 2004 Halifax Regional Municipality municipal election
- 2008 Halifax Regional Municipality municipal election
- 2012 Halifax Regional Municipality municipal election
- 2016 Halifax Regional Municipality municipal election
