= Colonial sexual violence (North America) =

Colonial systems in North America that enforce gender divides

Colonial sexual violence in North America refers to the history of sexual violence during the period of settler colonialism in Canada and the United States. As settler colonialism seeks the replacement of a territory's indigenous people with settlers, it has often been associated with practices such as wartime sexual violence. In North America specifically, there is a history of settler colonialism related to the Spanish and British empires, which had different cultural relationships with the notion of sexuality from the people native to these territories. Their different customs and colonial relationship to the land led to the construction of systems and institutions that reinforced gender divides, supported sexual exploitation, and used patriarchy as a means to control the Indigenous population.

These systems not only affected people differently based on sex and gender, but disrupted traditional ways of living in a manner that disrupted identity entirely. Given that the history and legacy of settler colonialism is still present to this day, the effects of these systems remain, and they have been part of other colonial efforts such as the residential school system, MMIW, and the Indian Act.

When Spanish settlers arrived in colonial North America, they brought the idea of private property. Prior to their arrival, indigenous people typically did not believe control over other's sexuality was possible. When Spanish settlers arrived, they believed rape was a right of conquest and expected captives to engage in sex without consideration to consent.

The English people who came to North America promoted "proper" sex, meaning the purpose of sex was reproduction. Protestant churches promoted that sexual relations outside of marriage were sinful. This led to one motive for marriage to express sexual lust to be compliant with church policy.

== Patriarchal systems ==
Patriarchal systems are designed to keep an unequal power imbalance in society. This power imbalance favours men and disenfranchises women, making them second-class citizens. Patriarchal systems are designed to benefit men as a whole, though specific analyses often focus on the ways in which identities such as race, sexual orientation, and ethnicity contribute to or are affected by these systems. These ideas on how humans should organize themselves blend into political, social and religious teachings and shape how an individual sees themselves within society. These systems can only function when the majority share and participate in a common ideology; everyone participates in the patriarchy regardless of their race or gender. When Europeans colonized North America, they arrived with pre-existing social organizations and enforced them through violence.

Patriarchal systems develop male-centric ideologies on sex, gender and gender representations, men decided how the world should be, rather than looking to others and their experiences. This system stresses the importance of gender roles, how a man is to look, think, and feel become opposite to that of a woman. Patriarchy is present in every sphere of human life and can control aspects of life outside the social. The patriarchy also plays strongly into what is considered desirable in women. Within this system, a good woman is a godly woman who stays home and provides motherly care for her children. She is pure and obedient to her husband and shares in his religious and political beliefs. This hierarchy is essential for control, and within patriarchal systems, one has varying levels of control. For example, a white woman living in England has more control than a woman of non-European descent. This is very important for understanding how this oppressive system affected colonized people in the past as well as in the present.

=== Role of masculinity ===
Colonial sexual violence affected men in different ways than it affected women. In many traditional Indigenous societies, the man's role was to provide for and protect their communities which gave them an identity. Skills in these areas were taught and performed by young men, and their successes were celebrated by older male role models. This created a positive sense of masculinity and manhood within Indigenous communities grounded in traditional Indigenous beliefs such as kindness, community, and equality. When European systems were forced onto Indigenous groups their ways of life and identity changed to conform with European ideals.

Patriarchal systems, heteronormative ideals, and race science introduced by European colonizers were used to differentiate between the "civilized" European and the Indigenous "other". Colonial masculinity, masculinity rooted in violence, conquest, and superiority, was only able to exist because there was an “other” to socially dominate. Indigenous masculinity was considered weak because of the sexual perversions that it allowed and this was used to create an image of Indigenous people as inhuman and justify the violence perpetrated against them. Implementing these systems disempowered Indigenous men and the adoption of colonial masculinity allowed for the acceptance of sexual violence in Indigenous communities because women no longer had the power to protect themselves and men were trying to prove their masculinity was on par with the colonizers.

== Sexual violence in North America ==
Many scholars comment on the strong connection between colonialism and rape. Some argue that rape was uncommon among Indigenous communities before the arrival of Europeans. This has to do with the patriarchal society that Europeans enforced onto many Indigenous communities and the change from Indigenous matriarchs to Indigenous patriarchs. The patriarchy of Europeans promoted the idea of nudity with sexuality; therefore Indigenous women were seen as lewd and impure. Sexual violence against Indigenous women ties in closely with the need for control and power: when an Indigenous woman is raped it is seen as permissible and necessary due to the understanding that Indigenous women are less than white women and bordering on inhuman. There were many instances where colonists openly proclaimed that Indigenous women were sinful and that there was no such thing as a virtuous Indigenous woman.

Sexual violence was also used as a way further instill control over, and divide, Indigenous and white women. By creating narratives of the murderous Indigenous man, white men were able to demonstrate their superiority over and further dehumanize Indigenous people. This has continued into the present day: Indigenous women are raped twice as often as any other minority group. Studies have also proven that most of these rapes are committed by white assailants.

=== Affective control and childhood sexual abuse ===
Emotions were weaponized beginning in the 1960s to create internalized colonialism and control Indigenous populations through inward control and shame, rather than physically violent acts. Through forced enrollment in residential schools, Indigenous children were taught that their culture, beliefs, and ways of being were wrong and that only conforming to whiteness would save them from their uncivilized ways of living and knowing. This turned children against themselves and their communities through identity stripping and brainwashing. Children who were subjected to the residential school system came to feel ashamed of who they were due to teachings that were acts of cultural genocide. The hierarchy of power was deeply engrained in the minds of Indigenous children, with dominant societal views reiterating the idea that Indigeneity was shameful and less than others. Assimilation was framed as the only way to move forward and be an acceptable and accepted citizen.

Within these schools, sexual abuse was widespread and served as discipline as well as social teachings regarding their place in the world. Sexual abuse removed their bodily autonomy, reinforcing that they have little say in their own lives, and created the narrative that they exist to please others.

Abuse stemming from residential schools continues to be seen today through generational trauma and continued cycles of abuse. This further harms Indigenous people as it shows itself as addictions, broken families, lack of community or family connection, shame, and cultural distance.

=== Combatting colonial sexual violence ===
Indigenous scholars agree that combatting the continued colonial sexual violence must be done collectively as a community and encompass traditional Indigenous healing practices. There are continued challenges for Indigenous people due to racism and the resistance from society to accept two-spirit and queer people. Racism and heteropatriarchy were built together and rely on one another to continue existing, creating, and upholding that idea of "other" within society. As Tompson Highway explains, "if the colonial project was to succeed, we are not supposed to be here" showing the resilience that Indigenous communities hold and the steps being taken towards accepting two-spirit people and decolonizing sex, love, and gender within their communities despite the cultural genocide enacted.

Geraldine King speaks of the need to reconnect to the land, community, and ceremony to break the cycle of collective trauma and cultivate love.
