= Foster care in Canada =

Foster children in Canada are known as permanent wards (crown wards in Ontario). A ward is someone, in this case a child, placed under protection of a legal guardian and are the legal responsibility of the government. Census data from 2011 counted children in foster care for the first time, counting 47,885 children in care. The majority of foster children – 29,590, or about 62% – were aged 14 and under. The wards remain under the care of the government until they "age out of care." This age is different depending on the province.

== Provincial differences ==
Different provinces have different regulations for the wards in their care. Many of the provinces also have third party groups set up to support both youth and alumni in and from care. These networks are not connected to the provincial governments

Province	Rate per 1000*	Percentage	Age of protection**	Youth network
British Columbia	10.1	1.01%	19	Federation of BC Youth in Care Networks
Alberta	10.6	1.06%	18	Alberta Youth in Care and Custody Network
Saskatchewan	21.7	2.17%	16	Saskatchewan Youth in Care and Custody Network
Manitoba	24.4	2.44%	18	Voices: Manitoba's Youth in Care Network
Ontario	6.4	0.64%	18	Ontario Youth Communication and Advocacy Network
Quebec	7.8	0.78%	18	–
New Brunswick	9.0	0.90%	16	Partners for Youth
Nova Scotia	8.8	0.88%	16	Youth Voices of Nova Scotia Society
Prince Edward Island	5.3	0.53%	16	Prince Edward Island Youth in Care Network;
Newfoundland	7.5	0.75%	16	–
Yukon	24.7	2.47%	19	–
Northwest Territories	30.8	3.08%	16	–
Nunavut	15.3	1.53%	16	–

*rate per 1000 youth in care
**Note: Children with disabilities are eligible for protective services until age 19.

== Cases ==
Cases are filed though individual provinces Social Services departments. In 92% of cases, the child remains at home and is not in put in an Out-of-Home Placement.

The three most common categories for maltreatment are ‘neglect’ and ‘Exposure to intimate partner violence’ (witness of physical or emotional abuse) both tied at 34%, followed by physical abuse at 20%. Sexual abuse sits at 3%. Police statistics for youth under 18 show that youth, accounting for 21% of the Canadian population account for 21% of all physical assaults and 61% of all sexual assaults in Canada. In 71% of all police-reported assaults, the victims were between the ages of 12–17.

86% of the time, cases are filed against the biological mother.

=== Common primary caregiver risk factors ===
- Victim of domestic violence – 46%
- Few social supports – 39%
- Mental health issues – 27%
- Alcohol abuse – 21%,
- Drug/solvent abuse – 17%.

A former youth from care is also considered to be the risk factor in 8% of cases.

== Care arrangements/placements ==
There are several different types of out-of-home placements or care arrangements:

- Informal kinship: informal arrangement within extended family (ie.grandparent)
- Kinship foster care: formal arrangement within extended family (ie.grandparent)
- Family foster care(non-kinship): family-based care (family structure)
- Group home placement: group living, 24h staff on duty
- Residential/secure treatment: commonly referred to as "lock up", these homes are for children that need extra therapeutic treatment.

Informal kinship 4%; Foster care (kinship & non-kinship) 4%; Group home/secure treatment 0% (rate of .25/1000 children)

== Aboriginal children in foster care ==
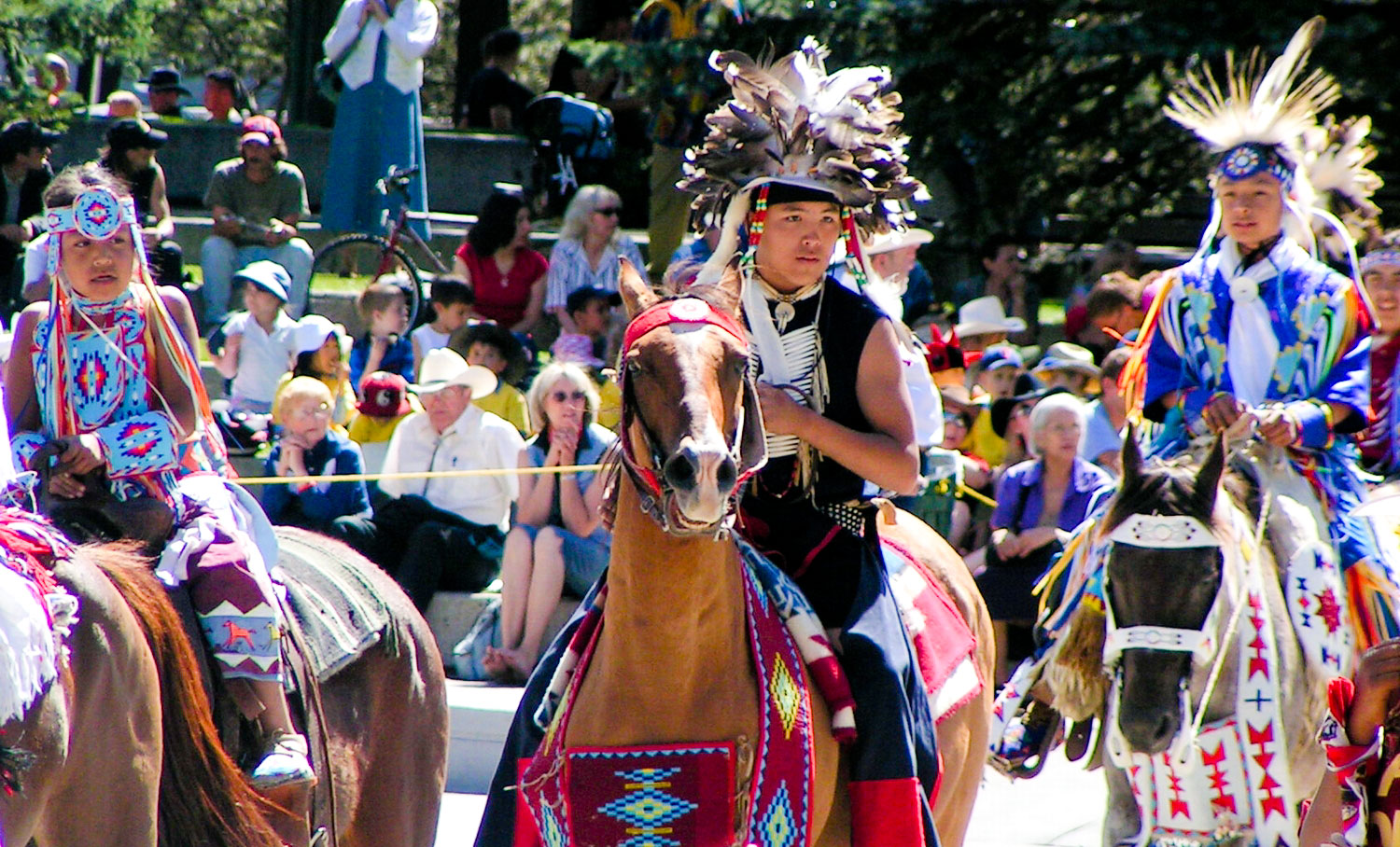
TsuuT'ina children at a parade

There is a severe over representation of Aboriginal youth in Canada's foster care system. Of all children in care, the percentage of Aboriginal children reaches 62% to 85% in some provinces. First Nation children make up 82% of the Aboriginal children in foster care, while Metis children make up 13%, and Inuit children make up 4%.

Statistics Canada survey (2016)
Province	% of children in foster care who are aboriginal	% of the total population that is aboriginal
British Columbia	56%	5.9%
Alberta	73.6%	6.5%
Saskatchewan	87%	16.3%
Manitoba	84.6%	18%
Ontario	25.5%	2.8%
Quebec	15.4%	2.3%
Newfoundland and Labrador	28%	8.9%
New Brunswick	28.8%	4%
Nova Scotia	23.9%	5.7%
Prince Edward Island	0%	2%
Yukon	100%	23.3%
Northwest Territories	93.8%	50.7%
Nunavut	100%	85.9%
Canada	48%	4.9%

Many legal actions have been taken attempting at correcting the overrepresentation. For example, In 1995, the Aboriginal Custom Adoption Recognition Act came into effect recognizing Aboriginal customary law with regards to custom adoptions in the Northwest Territories, a form of adoption that has been practised by many Indigenous communities for generations. Lastly, In 2017, Bill 99 was introduced as an amendment to the Youth Protection Act of Quebec, bringing the preservation of culture as an important factor in the decision making process for foster children, and stated that whenever possible, Indigenous children will be placed with a member of his extended family or community.

There are many indigenous organizations, services and activist groups who work in collaboration with the federal government of Canada and within each province or territory to manage services for First Nations, Inuit and Métis families. These groups work to find ways to reduce the number of indigenous children taken into the foster care system for racially biased and/or preventable reasons. They also attempt to act as third part mediators who are literate in the social welfare system, providing avenues for social workers and Indigenous families to be in healthy communication and trusting relationships. This is vital considering the history of the Sixties Scoop.

Indigenous-based agencies deliver mandated child and family services and programs in a way which maintains and strengthens the individual, the family, and the community within the context of Indigenous values and customs. Without indigenous networks of care, certain alternative care models might be disregarded or withheld from communities who practice these traditions. Additionally, Customary care preserves a child's cultural identity, respects the child's heritage, facilitates cross-generational connections, and recognizes the role of the community in raising its children.

== Child functioning concerns ==
While 54% of cases have no child functioning concerns, a wide range of categories for physical, emotional, cognitive and behavioural issues may be exhibited by youth:

- Academic difficulties: 23%. Child has normal to above-normal intelligence, but has difficulties in one area. (i.e., reading or math)
- Depression/anxiety/withdrawal persisting almost daily for two weeks or more: 19%.
- Aggression: 15%
- Attachment issues: 14%. Child does not have physical or emotional closeness to the caregiver. It is difficult for the child to seek comfort, support or protection.
- ADD/ADHD: 11%
- Developmental disability: 11%
- Failure, not caused by organic reasons, to meet developmental milestones: 9%
- Self-harming behavior, self-mutilation (i.e. cutting) to suicide: 6%.
- Suicidal thoughts, from fleeting to detailed plan: 4%
- Running away from home on multiple occasions for at least one overnight period: 4%
- Inappropriate sexual behavior: 4%. Age-inappropriate behavior with toys, self or others; sexually explicit drawings or descriptions, sophisticated or unusual sexual knowledge, prostitution or seductive behaviour.
- Fetal alcohol syndrome: 4%
- Drug/solvent abuse: 4%
- Alcohol abuse: 3%
- Youth Criminal Justice Act involvement (charges or incarceration): 2%
- Physical disability: 2%
- Positive toxicology at birth: 1% positive for drugs or alcohol
- Other: 4%

== Health ==
Many children enter care with bad health; over 90% have medical needs ranging from minor skin conditions to severe neurological disease. Children in care experience twice as many chronic difficulties, such as poor eyesight and hearing, when compared to children outside of the system. Often, children in care have poor or undocumented history of immunizations. Children in kinship care exhibit fewer health problems then those in regular foster care. Advice on smoking, drug and alcohol use as well as safe sex practices are most often given only after the child was engaged in such activities.

== Transitioning out of care ==
In a number of studies, youth who have aged out of the child welfare system have spoken of their experiences and highlighted areas where they could have been better prepared for their transition from care. They speak of the frustration of being "cut off" from the system once they reach their 18th (or 19th) birthday to fend for themselves, with limited life skills, financial support and support networks. The transition from care is alluded to as a process that may take many years, not an event triggered by a youth’s 18th (or 19th) birthday. In most cases, the youth were not emotionally ready to live independently. Youth living with their families don’t typically achieve independence until their mid- to late-twenties, whereas youth in care are "expelled" from the system at age 18, whether they are ready or not.
–Anne Tweddle in Youth Leaving Care Report

For youth aged 24 years from the general public, 15% did not complete high school, 13.8% are unemployed, 6.4% are pregnant or are an unwed parent, and 5.5% are on public assistance. For youth from the foster care system of the same age, 50% did not complete high school, 50% are unemployed, 60% are pregnant or are an unwed parent (among females), and 30% are on public assistance.

== See also ==
- Children's Aid Society (Canada)
