= David Bruce MacDonald =

Canadian political scientist (1973-)

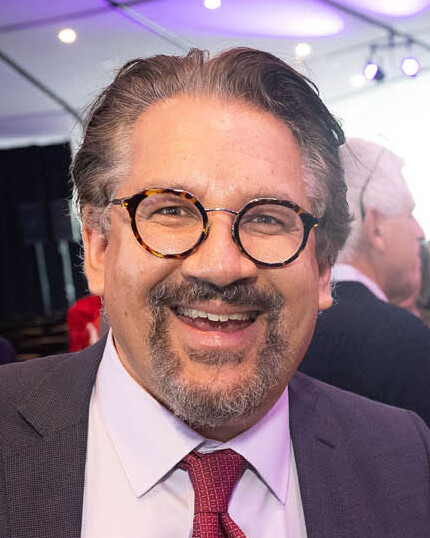
- MacDonald in 2024
- Born: June 15, 1973 (age 53)
- Education: Carleton University; University of Ottawa
- Occupation: Professor of Political Science

David Bruce MacDonald (born 15 June 1973) is a Canadian political scientist who studies international relations, genocide, and political myths.

== Career ==
MacDonald is professor in Political Science at the University of Guelph, Ontario, Canada and served as the Research Leadership Chair for the College of Social and Applied Human Sciences (2017 to 2020). From 2002 to 2008, he worked as a senior lecturer at the Political Studies Department, University of Otago, Dunedin, New Zealand. From 1999 to 2002 he was Assistant Visiting Professor in the Social Sciences at the ECSP Europe (Paris).

He was deputy editor/book reviews editor of Millennium: Journal of International Studies. He holds a PhD in international relations from the London School of Economics LSE, which he attended as a Rotary Ambassadorial Scholar. His PhD thesis was entitled Balkan holocausts? Comparing genocide myths and historical revisionism in Serbian and Croatian nationalist writing: 1986-1999. He earned his BA from Carleton University, and his MA in political science from the University of Ottawa. MacDonald has contributed as a writer to multiple Canadian journalistic publications, such as The Globe and Mail, The National Post, and the Toronto Star.

== Areas of work ==
=== Former Yugoslavia ===
His first book Balkan Holocausts?: Serbian and Croatian Victim Centered Propaganda and the War in Yugoslavia, compares and contrasts Serbian and Croatian propaganda from 1986 to 1999, analyzing each group's contemporary interpretations of history and current events.

=== Identity politics and genocide ===
Identity Politics in the Age of Genocide examined how Holocaust "Americanization" impacted other ethnic and social groups. The book featured theoretical chapters about the use/misuse of the term (Holocaust) by ethnic and social groups, and dissected claims of Holocaust uniqueness (with analysis of fourteen arguments).

=== U.S. politics ===
Thinking History, Fighting Evil applies his theoretical work to the study of American domestic and foreign policy. The work presents an exploration of how World War II analogies, particularly those focused on the Holocaust, have colored American foreign policy-making after 9/11.

== Publications ==
=== Books ===
- Balkan holocausts?: Serbian and Croatian victim-centred propaganda and the war in Yugoslavia. Oxford: Manchester University Press (2002). ISBN 978-0-71906-466-1
- The Ethics of Foreign Policy, co-edited with R.G. Patman and B. Mason-Parker. Ashgate Publishing Ltd. (2007). ISBN 978-0-75464-377-7
- Identity Politics in the Age of Genocide: The Holocaust and Historical Representation. Routledge (2007). ISBN 978-1-13408-571-2
- Thinking History, Fighting Evil: Neoconservatives and the Perils of Historical Analogy in American Politics. Lexington/Rowman & Littlefield (2009). ISBN 978-0-73912-503-8
- Introduction to Politics, co-authored with Robert Garner, Peter Ferdinand and Stephanie Lawson. Toronto: Oxford University Press (2011). ISBN 978-0-19902-173-4
- The Bush Leadership and the Power of Ideas, co-edited with Dirk Nabers. Routledge (2012). ISBN 978-1-40944-715-3
- Europe in Its Own Eyes, Europe in the Eyes of the Other. Waterloo: Wilfrid Laurier University Press (2014). ISBN 978-1-55458-840-4

=== Selected Book Chapters ===
- "Regionalism: New Zealand, Asia, the Pacific, and Australia" in Robert G. Patman and Chris Rudd (eds.) Sovereignty Under Siege? The Case of New Zealand (London: Ashgate Press, 2005) pp. 171–92. ISBN 978-1-1382-7752-6
- "Subaltern Discourse and Genocide: Serbian Victimization and Historical Justifications for War: 1980-2000", in Nicholas Robins and Adam Jones (eds), Genocides By The Oppressed: Subaltern Movements and Retributive Genocide (Indiana University Press, 2008). ISBN 978-0-2532-2077-6
- "Living Together or Hating Each Other?," in Charles Ingrao and Thomas Emmert (eds) Confronting the Yugoslav Controversies: A Scholar’s Initiative (Lafayette, ID: Purdue University Press, 2009). ISBN 978-1-5575-3617-4
- "The Power of Ideas in International Relations" in D. Nabers and N. Godehardt (eds), Regional Powers and Regional Orders (London: Routledge, 2011). ISBN 978-0-4156-0383-6
- "America’s Memory Problems: Diaspora Groups, Civil Society and the Perils of ‘Chosen Amnesia’" in Jing-Bao Nie, Nanyan Guo, Arthur Kleinman (eds), Japanese Wartime Medical Atrocities: Comparative Perspectives on Science, History and Ethics (Routledge: 2011). ISBN 978-0-4156-8228-2
- "Australia and New Zealand: Special Relationships in the Anglo-American World", with Brendon O’Connor in Peter J Katzenstein (ed.) Anglo-America and its Discontents: Civilizational Identities beyond West and East, (New York: Routledge, 2012). ISBN 978-0-4158-0955-9
- Co-editor with R.G. Patman and D. Nabers, several chapters in The Bush Leadership, the Power of Ideas and the War on Terror (Routledge, 2012). ISBN 978-1-1382-7480-8

=== Selected Articles ===
- "Daring to compare: The debate about a Maori ‘holocaust’ in New Zealand", Journal of Genocide Research (September 2003) pp. 383–404.
- "Forgetting and Denying: Iris Chang, the Holocaust and the Challenge of Nanking", International Politics (2005) pp. 403–28. Lead Article.
- "Globalizing the Holocaust: A Jewish "useable past" in Serbian and Croatian nationalism", PORTAL, Vol. 2, No. 2 (2005) pp. 1–31.
- "Pushing the Limits of Humanity?: Reinterpreting Animal Rights and ‘Personhood’ through the Prism of the Holocaust", Journal of Human Rights Vol. 5, No. 4 (2006) pp. 417–39.
- "First Nations, Residential Schools, and the Americanization of the Holocaust: Rewriting Indigenous History in America, Australia, and Canada", Canadian Journal of Political Science (December 2007) pp. 1–21. Lead Article.
- "Bush’s America and the New Exceptionalism: The Holocaust, Victimhood and the Trans-Atlantic Rift" Third World Quarterly Vol. 29 No. 6 (September 2008)
- "The Genocide Question and Indian Residential Schools in Canada" co-authored with Graham Hudson Canadian Journal of Political Science (June 2012)
