= Canadian Indian residential school gravesites =

The Canadian Indian residential school system (Note: Indian is used here because of the historical nature of the article and the precision of the name, as with Indian hospital. It was, and continues to be, used by government officials, Indigenous peoples and historians while referencing the school system. The use of the name also provides relevant context about the era in which the system was established, specifically one in which Indigenous peoples in Canada were homogeneously referred to as Indians rather than by language that distinguishes First Nations, Inuit and Métis peoples. Use of Indian is limited throughout the article to proper nouns and references to government legislation.) was a network of boarding schools for Indigenous children directed and funded by the government of Canada through the Department of Indian Affairs. Canada is a settler society which established residential schools aimed at assimilating Indigenous children into Euro-Canadian culture. The schools were administered by various Christian churches from 1828 to 1997.

Students' bodies were often buried in school cemeteries to keep costs as low as possible. Comparatively few cemeteries associated with residential schools are explicitly referenced in surviving documents, but the age and duration of the schools suggests that most had a cemetery associated with them. Many cemeteries were unregistered, and as such the locations of many burial sites and names of residential school children have been lost. Over 4,000 students died while attending Canadian residential schools.

Remains have been found on some school grounds. In 1974, the cemetery of the Battleford Industrial School was excavated, revealing 72 bodies. Bodies have also been unearthed accidentally during construction (e.g.: 19 at Muscowequan Indian Residential School in 1992) and by flooding (e.g.: 34 at Dunbow Industrial School in 1996). Starting in 2018, many First Nations communities began using ground-penetrating radar and cadaver dogs to search for potential graves. Announcement of 215 anomalies at Kamloops Indian Residential School in May 2021 made international news and became symbolic of the larger search for children who went missing and died at residential schools. Most communities have not yet followed these searches with excavations due to a lack of community consensus on whether to disturb burials. As of December 2025, only St. Joseph's Residential School in Fort Resolution has found remains based on radar and dog information. Partial excavations at three other schools have not found remains.

Disputes regarding the conclusiveness of the evidence has helped spawn a movement of denialism about the existence of some or all residential school burial sites. Indigenous groups and academics have dismissed claims of a "mass grave hoax", saying that claimed discoveries of mass graves were present in a minority of stories published by mainstream media and that there had been public misinterpretation of what had actually been announced in 2021. Federal Justice Minister David Lametti said in 2023 that he was open to outlawing residential school denialism. His successor, Arif Virani, did not take a position on the issue.

The Government of Canada formed the Truth and Reconciliation Commission in 2008. The commission's findings included recognition of past colonial genocide and settlement agreements. In October 2022, the House of Commons of Canada unanimously passed a motion calling on the federal Canadian government to recognize the residential school system as genocide. This acknowledgment was followed by a visit by Pope Francis, who apologized for Church members' roles in the genocide. Beginning in June 2021, there was a series of arsons and other acts of vandalism against Christian churches that law enforcement, politicians, and tribal officials speculated was spurred by anger towards Christians over the schools and gravesites.

== Background ==
The Canadian residential school system, funded by the Canadian government and administered by Roman Catholic, Anglican, Methodist, Presbyterian and United religious groups, was created to remove and isolate Indigenous children and assimilate them.

The 1876 Act to Promote the Gradual Assimilation of the Indian Tribes of Canada provided the legal framework for the residential school system. The last residential school closed in 1997. The Truth and Reconciliation Commission found records of 4037 deaths at the schools, and published a list. There were repeated outbreaks of tuberculosis in the early 20th century; "given their cramped conditions and negligent health practices, residential schools were hotbeds for the spread of TB", a National Post reporter wrote. Bodies were not returned to their families for burial, and families were not normally informed of the circumstances of their child's death. Commission chairman Murray Sinclair estimated in an interview that the true number of deaths could range between 6,000 and 25,000. Some of the students who died at the schools were buried in unmarked graves. Over time, markers at some graveyards were lost or destroyed.

== Alberta ==
=== Grouard ===
On March 1, 2022, Kapawe'no First Nation announced the results of a search of 3696.5m^{2} at the site of St. Bernard's Residential School. Conducted by the Institute for Prairie and Indigenous Archeology at the University of Alberta, it used ground-penetrating radar and multi-spectral imagery captured by drone. It found 169 potential gravesites: 129 probable, 32 thought possible, and 8 likely. The next step for the likely graves would be to exhume. The nation announced plans to search further based on the testimony of residential school survivors, including at a nearby Anglican church and a site where Indian agents and the North-West Mounted Police had structures. The Truth and Reconciliation Commission had found records for the deaths of 10 students. The Catholic Church operated the school from 1894 to 1961.

=== Saddle Lake ===
Since 2004, partial remains have been repeatedly discovered while digging new graves in the Saddle Lake Cree Nation community cemetery, located near the former site of the Blue Quills Indian Residential School. At the time, the remains were re-interred upon discovery, but investigators searching for unmarked graves on their territory announced on May 17, 2022, that they believed the accidentally excavated remains were the remains of children who died at residential school. The investigators believe that the discoveries include a mass grave, where they found "numerous children-sized skeletons wrapped in white cloth," and theorized that there could have been from a typhoid outbreak at the school. To prevent further accidental excavations, the nation has requested funding to acquire ground-penetrating radar equipment and carry out a non-invasive survey.

A report released in January 2023 said that the gravesite had been confirmed by ground-penetrating radar. A report in April 2023 announced that an investigation of the site using ground-penetrating radar and drone imagery found 19 anomalies which might be gravesites. The nation intended to use the findings as a starting point for further investigation. In October 2023, the remains of a child were found at the site.

=== St. Bruno's ===
In June 2022, the Institute for Prairie Indigenous Archaeology (PIA) led a preliminary ground-penetrating radar search of the former site of St. Bruno's Indian Residential School, which covered the cemetery, the root cellars, and some areas of the schoolyard, 1.8 acres in total. Based on that search, a report released by a group of Treaty 8 chiefs and the University of Alberta in June 2023 announced the identification of 88 "potential unmarked graves", of which 14 were listed as "likely", meaning that they had multiple indicators of being graves.

=== St. Joseph's Industrial School (Dunbow Industrial School) ===
In 1996, a flood eroded the banks of the Highwood River, exposing the caskets and remains of some of the 72 children known to have died while attending Dunbow Industrial School, also referred to as St. Joseph's. In May 2001, the remains of 34 children were identified and re-interred at a site further from the river following First Nations, Métis, and Christian traditions. Since then, local resident Laurie Sommerville has obtained school records from the Missionary Oblates, and worked on identifying the deceased children; she had identified 27 as of May 2013.

During the school's 38 years of operation, from 1884 to 1922, one in six of the 430 total students died. Most were Siksika, or TsuuT'ina (then known as Blackfoot and Sarcee).

== British Columbia ==
=== Ahousaht ===
Ahousaht First Nation in Ahousat planned excavations in advance of a planned real estate project. Ahousaht Indian Residential School, on Flores Island near Maaqtusiis, was run by Presbyterians. The Catholic-run Christie Indian Residential School operated on Meares Island from 1900 to 1983 and was the last residential school to close in Canada.

=== Alert Bay ===
St. Michael's Indian Residential School, in Alert Bay – led by 'Namgis First Nation; the search was in "early stages" as of July 2021, and a press release in February 2022 officially announced the start of the inquiry, detailing plans for community engagement, a project manager, and a monument following the investigation.

=== Alberni ===
On February 21, 2023, Tseshaht First Nation released "phase one" findings, the results of a ground-penetrating radar survey of just over 10% of the area identified at Alberni Indian Residential School for investigation, as well as historical research that included interviewing survivors of the school, which was run first by Presbyterians, then the United Church, and eventually the Canadian government. The findings reported 17 suspected Interviews with survivors identified 67 students who died at AIRS.

Malnutrition was rampant at almost all residential schools, but at Alberni, milk and dental care were deliberately withheld for two years from some children by researchers studying the effects of malnutrition. Records reviewed by the TRC included 29 children who`lans to contact family members of those dead students that can be identified, and eventually hold a ceremony to tear the old school building down. Tseshaht First Nation announced plans to search near the Alberni Indian Residential School (AIRS) building in August 2021, . Funding was secured by December 2021 of over CA$1 million and an initial GPR scan was scheduled in the spring of 2022. The search began in earnest in July 2022.

=== Kamloops ===
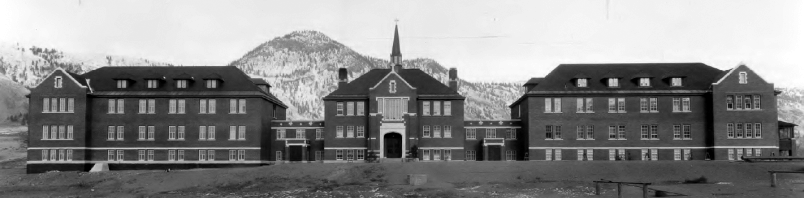
Kamloops Residential School in 1920

In 2021, Sarah Beaulieu, an anthropologist experienced at searching for historical gravesites, surveyed the site of the Kamloops Indian Residential School on the lands of Tk’emlúps te Secwépemc First Nation with ground-penetrating radar and observed "disruptions in the ground" which she concluded could be 200 unmarked graves, based on "their placement, size, depth, and other features" though "only forensic investigation with excavation" would confirm if these were actually human remains. As of May 2022, the nation had assembled a team of technical archaeologists and professors as they continue their investigation of the site, which Chief Rosanne Casimir described as an ongoing process from "exhumation to memorialization." The Tk’emlups te Secwepemc band announced on the third anniversary of their initial announcement of the graves' discovery that their investigation was proceeding but would remain confidential to preserve its integrity. Denialists have gone to the burial site with shovels to "prove" that there are no human remains at the site.

As of September 2024, no human remains have been excavated or confirmed at the former Kamloops Indian Residential School site. Researchers and commentators have raised questions about the evidence supporting claims of mass graves, noting that the anomalies detected in 2021 remain unverified and that historical records and the Truth and Reconciliation Commission's investigations did not previously identify the site as a burial ground.

=== Kootenay ===
On June 30, 2021, the leadership of ʔaq̓am, a band of the Ktunaxa Nation, announced that 182 unmarked grave sites had been identified in a cemetery next to the site of the former St. Eugene's Mission Residential School. Over 5,000 children attended the school between 1912 and 1970. The building now operates as a casino and golf resort.

Maintenance workers came upon an "unknown and unmarked grave" in 2020. Scans with ground-penetrating radar identified additional anomalies. Graves were traditionally marked with wooden crosses.

The graveyard dates to 1865, before the school was built, and has been used continuously for burials by the local settler and indigenous community, including St. Eugene Hospital, which operated from 1874 to 1899. The residential school was in operation from 1912 to 1970. The band said it was "extremely difficult to establish whether or not these unmarked graves contain the remains of children who attended the St. Eugene Residential School".

=== Kuper Island ===
In 2018 the Penelakut chief, council and elders met with researchers from the University of British Columbia to discuss a possible survey of the grounds of the former Kuper Island Indian Residential school for unmarked graves using GPR. This work would build on previous GPR surveys conducted in known cemeteries in the community in 2014 and 2016. In a memo sent to band members on July 8, 2021, Chief Joan Brown of the Penelakut First Nation made reference to the discovery of at least 160 "undocumented and unmarked" graves located on the grounds of the former school, on an island off Vancouver Island. The memo was circulated in national media coverage on July 12. It is unclear whether the number referred to new findings. The school, referred to as "Canada's Alcatraz", was operated on Penelakut Island (formerly Kuper Island) from 1889 to 1969 by the Catholic Church, and from 1969 to 1975 by the federal government.

=== St. Augustine's ===
On April 20, 2023, Shíshálh Nation announced the discovery of 40 unmarked children's graves near the site of the former St. Augustine's Indian Residential School in Sechelt, BC, "shallow graves, only large enough for the young bodies to lay in the fetal position." The investigation made use of ground-penetrating radar and historical research, including interviews with survivors.

“These children were our aunties, they were our uncles, they were our future leaders that we never met,” the chief said in a statement. “They never grew up and decades later, they are still lost children.”

=== Squamish ===
St. Paul's Indian Residential School (Squamish), in North Vancouver – Joint investigation to uncover documents associated with the former residential school, as well as identify the burial sites of children that died while attending the school led by the Squamish Nation, Musqueam Nation and Tsleil-Waututh Nation, in collaboration with the Roman Catholic Archdiocese of Vancouver, announced August 10, 2021.

=== Stó:lō Nation ===
In September 2023, Stó:lō Nation announced that at least 158 of their children had died at three residential schools and a hospital; 37 children died at or due to their attendance at Coqualeetza Industrial Institute/Residential School in Chilliwack, 20 at St. Mary's, five at All Hallow School in Yale and 96 children between ages five and 20 at the Coqualeetza Indian Hospital.

- The Anglican Church of Canada operated All Hallows Residential School for girls in Yale. It operated from 1890 to 1917, when students were transferred to the school in Lytton.
- The Methodist-run Coqualeetza Residential School in Chilliwack operated from 1889 to 1940.
- St. Mary's Indian Residential School in Mission A 1958 photo of a funeral shows at least twelve graves outside the current St. Mary's cemetery fence line, an area now covered by blackberry bushes, with iron cross grave markers lying along the cemetery perimeter. The Coqualeetza grounds had a cemetery, but the remains were dug up and moved to three or four First Nations cemeteries in Chilliwack when the school closed in 1940. and became a children's hospital in 1941. Former employee Gerald Moran was convicted in 2004 of 12 counts of indecent assault committed during his time at the school. He was sentenced to three years in prison.

The Stó:lō had in 2021 announced the three-year search for unmarked graves at the former Fraser Valley residential school sites. In addition to searching known graveyards, the Stó:lō planned to look for unrecorded graves.

Late in 2021 memorial house post carvings were erected at the second location of the government-run St. Mary's, now Pekw'Xe:yles, and Coqualeetza to honor victims of abuse and those who died.

=== Williams Lake ===
In June 2021, Williams Lake First Nation announced it would lead a search of the site of Saint Joseph's Mission near Williams Lake. The search would use ground-penetrating radar, and focusing on 0.15 square kilometres (37 acres) of the 4.5 square kilometres (1,100 acres) site. Work began in late August 2021. Williams Lake First Nations announced on January 25, 2022, that 93 potential burial sites were discovered.

The investigation continued, and on January 24, 2023, the Nation announced that it had come to the conclusion that at least 28 children had died while students of the school, as opposed to the 16 reported by the National Centre for Truth and Reconciliation. The announcement also identified 66 more potential burial sites, for a total of 159, identified using GPR and aerial and terrestrial LiDAR. The Nation also announced that it was working with the B.C. Coroner's Service and attorney general to create a memorandum of understanding that would allow them to proceed with further work to confirm the potential gravesites, using small probes and DNA testing.

A least one student at the school committed suicide, and another died of hypothermia while trying to escape. Several religious leaders at the school were later convicted of sexually abusing the students, including Father Harold McIntee. In 2023 Williams Lake First Nation purchased the former school building, which had been privately owned.

== Manitoba ==
=== Brandon ===
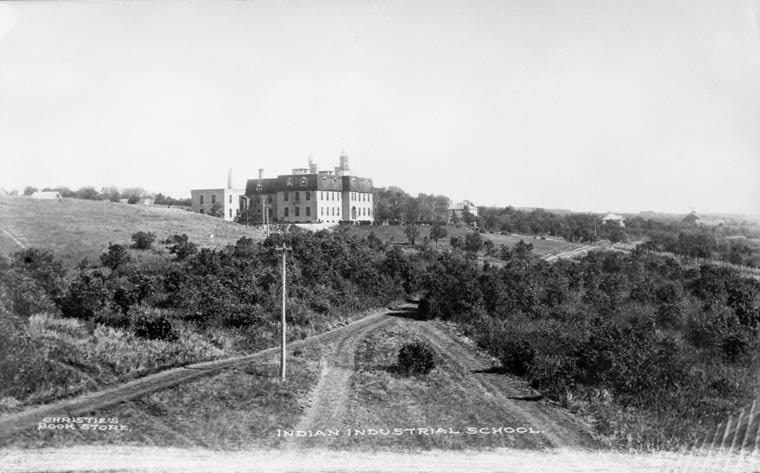
Brandon Residential School in 1920

Beginning in 2012, a team from Sioux Valley Dakota Nation and Simon Fraser University investigated two cemetery sites at Brandon Indian Residential School in Brandon. The project, which received funding for its work in April 2019, was delayed due to the COVID-19 pandemic. In addition to two previously known cemeteries, the project found a possible third burial site. On June 4, 2021, it was announced that 104 potential graves had been located, of which 78 are accountable through historical records.

=== Fort Alexander ===
As of late July 2021, Sagkeeng First Nation had begun a search of the former site of Fort Alexander Indian Residential School, near Powerview-Pine Falls in Manitoba, using drone surveying and ground-penetrating radar. On June 6, 2022, it announced it had found 190 "anomalies" during the search: 137 in one area and 53 in another. The anomalies were not found at the residential school. Having ruled out pipelines, sewer lines, and waterlines, work continued following the announcement to determine whether the anomalies were gravesites.

=== Pine Creek ===
On May 9, 2022, the Minegoziibe Anishinabe (formerly known as Pine Creek First Nation), began a ground-penetrating radar scan on the former site of Pine Creek Indian Residential School, through its contractor AltoMaxx. A preliminary report in June 2022 announced the discovery of six anomalies on the site. In August, 14 more had been found. The RCMP began an investigation in October 2022 of 71 ground anomalies identified in five scans of a 100-acre area around the site of the residential school, and around and underneath a Catholic church.

The community held a day of ceremony on July 24, 2023, to mark the beginning of an archaeological dig in the church basement, where 14 anomalies had been found. The excavation found no evidence of human remains. and the RCMP's investigation found no evidence of criminal activity.

=== Sandy Bay ===
A search at the site of the former Sandy Bay Residential School in Sandy Bay First Nation in May 2022 used ground-penetrating radar and drone imagery to identify 13 potential unmarked gravesites. Four were determined to have a "moderate probability" of being an unmarked grave and nine sites were assessed as "low probability". Plans were made for an excavation under the church.

== Northwest Territories ==
=== Fort Providence ===
From 1992 to 1994 Albert Lafferty, a Métis resident of Fort Providence, Northwest Territories led research at the old community cemetery near the former Sacred Heart Mission School operated by the Grey Nuns from 1867 to 1960 and the mission's associated hospital. He found that missionaries established the first cemetery there in 1868, but relocated the remains of eight missionaries to the present Catholic cemetery in 1929. They left behind the remains of hundreds of Indigenous people, and the cemetery was ploughed over in 1948, and became a potato field.

Lafferty's research, facilitated by the local diocese in Yellowknife, involved ground-penetrating radar and identified 298 people likely buried at the site in unmarked graves. This number included adults as well as 161 children from across the Deh-cho who attended the school. Some members of the community believe the actual number of buried students is much higher. A separate study estimated 150 total children and adults. The project was led by Deh Gáh Got'ı̨ę First Nation after an unmarked cemetery was discovered in the early 1990s.

In 2013 a memorial was erected on the site listing the names or, in the case of those whose names were not known, the identities of the people buried at the site.

Starting around 2009, former NWT premier Stephen Kakfwi made annual pilgrimages to the site to honour the dead in ceremony, and encouraged community members, and representatives of governments and religious institutions to do the same. In July 2021, Deh Gáh Got’ı̨ę First Nation confirmed that they would try to complete a further search of the former school grounds before the first snowfall, though community healing and acquiring funding were priorities.

== Ontario ==
=== McIntosh ===
On January 16, 2025, it was announced that a search conducted on a small portion of the grounds of the former McIntosh Indian Residential School in Grassy Narrows First Nation near Kenora revealed 114 suspected unmarked burial sites through visual survey and ground-penetrating radar. The rectangular depressions on the ground are suspected to be graves or burials because the length of these depressions measured 55–245 cm (22–96 in) long, soil disturbance around the depression, the orientation of the depression was in an east–west alignment, and distinct patterns of defined rows of these depressions. All but eight of the "unmarked burial features" were located within the ground's cemetery. The dimensions of over 70 of the features were indicative of possible child burials.

=== St. Mary's ===
On January 17, 2023, a statement released by Wauzhushk Onigum Nation announced the discovery of 171 "anomalies", which it called "plausible burials", located by ground-penetrating radar around the former St. Mary's Indian Residential School. "The Nation’s next steps are to gain greater certainty on the number of plausible graves in the cemetery grounds using additional technologies and to conduct additional investigations at several additional sites not covered...," it said.

== Saskatchewan ==
=== Battleford ===
Battleford Industrial School's final principal expressed concern over future generations forgetting the cemetery containing the bodies of former students at the school site:

When the Battleford school closed in 1914, Principal E. Matheson reminded Indian Affairs that there was a school cemetery that contained the bodies of seventy to eighty individuals, most of whom were former students. He worried that unless the government took steps to care for the cemetery, it would be overrun by stray cattle. Matheson had good reason for wishing to see the cemetery maintained: several of his family members were buried there. These concerns proved prophetic, since the location of this cemetery is not recorded in the available historical documentation, and neither does it appear in an internet search of Battleford cemeteries.

The land was never officially registered as a cemetery, and became dilapidated and vandalised. In 1974, five students from the Department of Anthropology and Archaeology at the University of Saskatchewan excavated 72 graves of the 74 in the Battleford school cemetery. Most of the people buried there are former students of the Industrial School. During the excavation, the contents of each unmarked grave were uncovered, identified, and recorded, then re-covered and marked with a marble marker, before a chain-link fence was erected around the outside of the site. On August 31, 1975, a ceremony reconsecrated the burial ground; a cairn had been erected with the names of fifty students known to be buried there.

In 2019, the cemetery was designated Provincial Heritage Property by the Government of Saskatchewan.

=== George Gordon ===
On April 20, 2022, George Gordon First Nation Chief Byron Bitternose announced that 14 possible gravesites had been identified using ground-penetrating radar at the site of the former George Gordon Indian Residential School. Records from the National Centre for Truth and Reconciliation found 49 student deaths found in school records. The school operated from 1888 to 1996.

=== Kamsack and Fort Pelly ===
A search using ground-penetrating radar was conducted by Keeseekoose First Nation on the former grounds of St. Philip's Indian Residential School in Kamsack, Saskatchewan, and the former site of another school near Fort Pelly, which had been erected at the expense of the Oblate Fathers from 1905 to 1913. The search by ground-penetrating radar revealed 42 potential unmarked graves at the Fort Pelly site, and 12 at St. Philip's. The first St. Philip's boarding school was built in 1901 from logs daubed with mortar and was attended by students from the Cote and Keesekoose reservations. The students in 1945 were Anishnabe (then known as Ojibwé, Ojibwa, Saulteux, Sauteux, or Saulteaux). According to Oblate records, in 1966 345 Indigenous children attended the Pelly school, and 95 boarders and 207 day students attended St Philip's, which closed in 1969.

=== La Ronge ===
A cemetery dating back to at least the early 1900s was situated by the Lac La Ronge Indian Residential School near La Ronge on or adjacent to land that is now Lac La Ronge Indian Band's urban reserve. The graveyard served community members, school staff and possibly students who died at the school. While the cemetery retains some headstones, rocks and other grave markings, SNC Lavalin was hired to search for potential unmarked graves using GPR within as well as outside the boundaries where some fear the unbaptized or those who committed suicide were buried.

As of December 23, 2021, the search was about 97 percent complete. Crosses were put up to mark possible gravesites identified by GPR.

=== Lestock ===
Initial work on a new water system accidentally dug up buried human bodies in 1992 and the nation ordered a search with GPR based on documentary records. Nineteen bodies were found with indications of further graves nearby. In 2018, a University of Alberta team identified an additional ten to fifteen potential gravesites by GPR. An influenza epidemic swept the area in the early 1900s and the graves are believed to contain people of Saulteaux, Cree, Métis and European origin. Further searches are planned.

=== Marieval ===
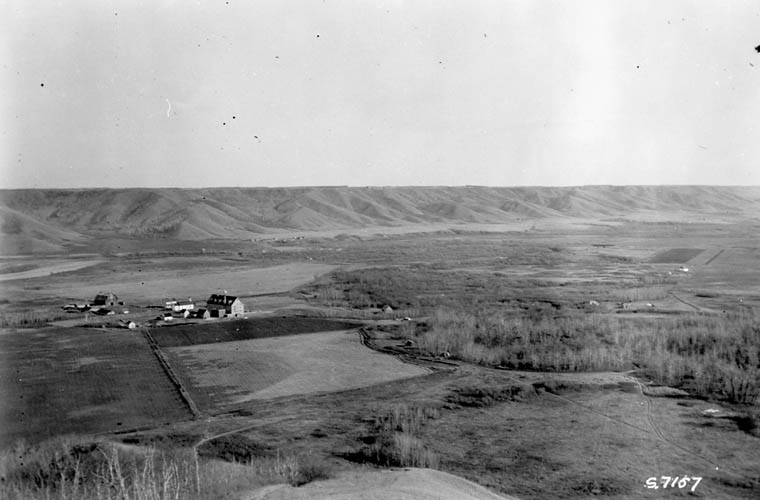
Marieval Residential School in 1923

A community graveyard next to Marieval Indian Residential School on the lands of Cowessess First Nation in Marieval was first used in 1885, before the school was established, and has included the graves of both children and adult parishioners of the Catholic Church. However, by 2021, only an estimated third of the graves remained marked.

Archbishop of Regina Don Bolen said that headstones were lost at least in part in the 1960s when an Oblate priest and a local First Nations chief "entered into a conflict" and the priest then used a bulldozer to knock over "huge numbers of tombstones." One person claiming relatives in the cemetery said he knew the workers who picked up the headstones. In 2019, the Archdiocese of Regina provided $70,000 to identify the unmarked graves and restore the cemetery.

A subsequent search for unmarked gravesites was delayed two years due to the COVID-19 pandemic. In May 2021, Cowessess First Nation announced it would search the site using ground-penetrating radar in collaboration with a group from Saskatchewan Polytechnic. The search began June 1 and expanded four times based on elder recollection of burials outside the school grounds.

On June 24, 2021, Cowessess First Nation Chief Cadmus Delorme announced that findings from the preliminary survey indicated the presence of up to 751 unmarked graves near the site of the former school. The preliminary figure was the highest number of potential or confirmed unmarked graves associated with a given residential school, according to the Federation of Sovereign Indigenous Nations (FSIN), which represents Saskatchewan's First Nations. Delorme underlined, "This is not a mass grave site. These are unmarked graves." In noting that the radar technology used had an error rate of 10–15%, he concluded that as a result of the loss of the headstones, "today, we have over 600 unmarked graves."

On October 8, 2021, Cowessess First Nation announced that names had been put to 300 of the gravesites. The identification was made possible through the records of the RCMP, the Catholic Church, and Indigenous and Northern Affairs Canada, as well as band oral history.

A press release published January 20, 2022, announced the identification of the 751 unmarked graves as belonging to "both former children who attended the residential school and locals, both First Nation and non-First Nations," and said that more research had to be done to be able to "share the true story by identifying which children did not make it home."

The search of the Marieval grounds resumed just over a year after the initial announcement, focusing on a livestock barn. An improved GPR system found many anomalous readings. In the words of lead lead researcher Barbara Lavallee, "the team knew something was there, but they couldn't say what." The research team then hired cadaver dogs to search in four areas of interest on the grounds as well as the barn. The dogs seemed confused, which their handler interpreted to mean that the human scent was so strong they did not know where to start. Further research alongside the University of Saskatchewan, University of Alberta, led to the use of an even more advanced GPR system, the kind used to examine Ancient Egyptian tombs, and the compilation of records and a timeline of school attendance with information from Université de Saint-Boniface. Further searches of the barn began in fall 2022.^{:160-3}

=== Qu'Appelle ===
As part of a project begun in November 2021, Star Blanket Cree Nation carried out a search of the former grounds of Qu'Appelle Indian Residential School in fall and winter 2022 using ground-penetrating radar. Its preliminary findings, announced January 12, 2023, included over 2000 "hits" on ground-penetrating radar and the discovery of a fragment of the jawbone of a child between 4 and 6, which the Saskatchewan Coroners Service estimated was approximately 125 years old. Not all "hits" are suspected graves. Further work was set to continue as of January 2023. James Daschuk pointed out in his book Clearing the Plains that despite the deaths of "almost 20 percent of the children at the school...between 1884 and 1905" Father Hugonnard the principal saw the health of the children there as generally good, and wrote that TB was "hereditary in the families of the deceased and the germs were brought from home".

=== Regina Indian Industrial School ===
In 2010 and 2012, an archaeological survey with ground-penetrating radar of the southern part of the private land that held the cemetery associated with the Regina Indian Industrial School (RIIS) found likely evidence of 38 graves, including six outside the cemetery fence. Documents from 1921 indicated that a prairie fire probably destroyed the wooden crosses marking thirty to forty gravesites, at the western edge of site of the former school. In 2014, an unpublished report by the Regina Planning Department indicated that the site contained the remains of about 35 First Nations and Métis children, as well as of two children of the school's first principal. The principal himself and his wife are also known to be buried there, as attested by a "small and barely visible gravestone" and "the only surviving marker in the cemetery" as of 2012. In September 2016, the cemetery became a municipal heritage site, and in July 2017 a provincial heritage site. It had been privately owned farmland since the 1980s. The land was "recovered" in 2011 by arrangement between the private owners, the RCMP, and the RIIS Commemorative Association. In 2019, a land transfer ceremony was held to give the land to the Commemorative Association. In the weeks before Canada's first National Day for Truth And Reconciliation on September 30, 2021, 38 orange metal feathers were placed in the ground on the site, to mark the 38 gravesites believed to be there. The metal markers were donated by Pasqua First Nation and Pro Metal Industries. The site is encircled by a white picket fence.

== Yukon ==
=== Chooutla Indian Residential School ===
A search led by the Chooutla Working Group in Carcross, Yukon, was scheduled to begin in summer 2023, with plans to expand search to other communities in future years. GeoScan, a survey company based in BC. searched 9.2 acres with ground-penetrating radar and found 15 anomalies grouped together in an area of 624 square feet. Built in 1911, the Choutla school was run by Anglicans and achieved a reputation for harsh discipline and poor food and health outcomes before it closed in 1969.

== Communities debating ==
A number of First Nations announced searches for unmarked graves at former residential school sites. Some of these searches were already underway prior to the Kamloops confirmation. Below are a list of school sites announced thus far:

- Old Sun (Blackfoot) Indian Residential School and Crowfoot Indian Residential School near Gleichen – search led by Siksika Nation using GPR in collaboration with the Institute for Prairie and Indigenous Archaeology at the University of Alberta. Site clean-up began in early August 2021, and a community info session was held in September 2021.
- In 2022, the Dene Nation proposed a CA$500,000 plan to the government to investigate 15 residential school locations for unmarked burial sites identified by the Truth and Reconciliation Committee. The schools are Immaculate Conception (Roman Catholic) and All Saints (Anglican) in Aklavik, Fleming Hall in Fort McPherson, Fort Providence, St. Joseph's in Fort Resolution, Bompas Hall (Anglican) and Dehcho Lapointe Hall (where children still attend school) in Fort Simpson, St. Peter's in Hay River, Grollier Hall (Roman Catholic) and Stringer Hall (Anglican) in Inuvik, Akaitcho Hall in Yellowknife, Federal Hostel in Délı̨nę, and All Saints in Shingle Point, Yukon.
- Ermineskin Indian Residential School – search announced August 2021, overseen by a group of elders from Ermineskin Cree Nation, carried out by engineers from SNC-Lavalin using GPR.
- Guy Hill Indian Residential School near The Pas – search led by Opaskwayak Cree Nation using GPR; Nation was preparing for the search as of late July 2021.
- McKay Indian Residential School near Dauphin, Manitoba – search led by the Opaskwayak Cree Nation and conducted by SNC-Lavalin with GPR. The search began in fall 2021, paused for the winter, and was to resume in June 2022. As of May 29, 2022, only a fraction of the search area had been covered.
- Mohawk Institute in Six Nations – investigation to be carried out by Six Nations Police, along with Brantford Police and OPP, overseen by a "Survivor's Secretariat" headed by Kimberly Murray, former executive director of the Truth and Reconciliation Commission. An unmarked burial site believed to contain the remains of an adolescent was found near the site in August 2020, and as of October 2021, investigations were underway to identify this child, and he came to be buried there, as well as whether their death can be linked to the residential school. A search of the former school grounds began in November 2021.
- Mount Elgin Indian Residential School in Chippewas of the Thames First Nation – on the first National Day for Truth and Reconciliation, September 30, 2020, Chippewas of the Thames announced that a probe into the site was in its early stages.
- The site of Sept-Îles Residential School (Notre-Dame de Sept-Îles) in Sept-Îles, Quebec – a group of Innu chiefs announced in June 2021 that they would put together a team to begin the process of conducting searches of the site for unmarked graves.
- Spanish Indian Residential Schools in Spanish, Ontario – members of the Sagamok Anishnawbek, Mississauga and Serpent River First Nations, which came together as the Nisoonag (Three Canoes) Partnership, held a ceremony on Saturday, September 18, 2021, to ask for the permission of the souls of the children possibly buried at the site of the schools. Other gatherings were held in June and October 2021, to reflect and prepare to apply for government funding to help with a search, and in February 2022 was announced that such a search would be taking place over the following 2–3 years.
- St. Anne's Indian Residential School in Fort Albany, Ontario – led by Fort Albany First Nation in collaboration with nearby communities, began in 2020 and ongoing as of April 2022.
- St. Michael's Indian Residential School, in Alert Bay – led by 'Namgis First Nation; the search was in "early stages" as of July 2021, and a press release in February 2022 officially announced the start of the inquiry, detailing plans for community engagement, contracting a project manager, and erecting a monument following the investigation.
- St. Paul's Indian Residential School (Squamish), in North Vancouver – Joint investigation to uncover documents associated with the former residential school, as well as identify the burial sites of children that died while attending the school led by the Squamish Nation, Musqueam Nation and Tsleil-Waututh Nation, in collaboration with the Roman Catholic Archdiocese of Vancouver, announced August 10, 2021.
- Thunderchild Indian Residential School in Delmas, Saskatchewan – search led by Battlefords Agency Tribal Chiefs, in association with SNC-Lavalin. An initial ground-penetrating radar search in July 2021 of the immediate area around the school site found no graves, but records and elder testimony indicate that 44 children died at the school. The gravestone of 14-year old Henry Atcheynum was also discovered by a farmer about a kilometre from the search area. This, and survivor testimony that graves were moved as much as twice, led BATC to expand the search area to banks of the Saskatchewan River. The BATC also planned to search the Battleford Industrial Residential School once the Delmas search was complete. The Catholic Church operated the Delmas school from 1901 until its destruction in a fire in 1948.
- The Tla-o-qui-aht First Nations were also engaged in an investigation as of August 17, 2021.
- Shubenacadie Nova Scotia—a member of Sipekneꞌkatik First Nation, a curator with the Nova Scotia Museum, and an associate professor from Saint Mary's University investigated the site of the former Shubenacadie Indian Residential School in Shubenacadie, Nova Scotia. They found unmarked graves from more than a hundred years before the school was founded, but nothing related to the school, which operated from 1929 to 1967. The building burned to the ground in 1986 and the land is now occupied by a plastics factory and used as farmland. The National Centre for Truth and Reconciliation lists 16 children who died while at the school, The investigation used GPR and aerial laser scanning. Sipekne’katik Chief Mike Sack said the search will resume if new information comes forward. The First Nation received federal funding in April 2022 to complete the fieldwork, gather knowledge, and commemorate the school's legacy.

== Reactions ==
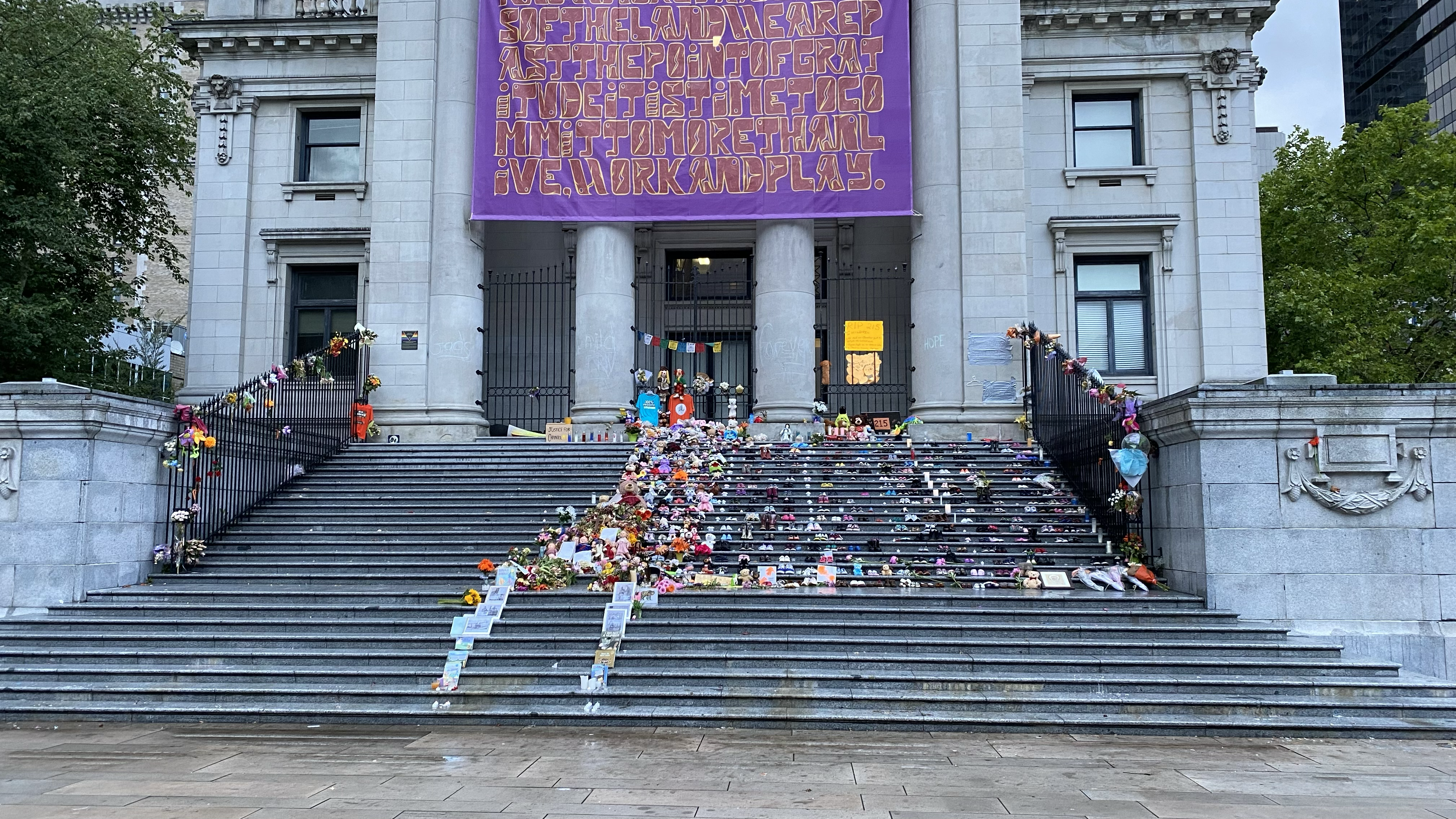
215 pairs of children's shoes laid out in rows at the Vancouver Art Gallery on June 6, 2021

Community memorials were set up at the Vancouver Art Gallery, the Ontario Legislative Building, as well as various government buildings and church buildings that had been in charge of running the residential school system.

On May 28, 2021, the day after it was reported that the remains of 215 bodies (later referred to as 200 "targets of interest" by Dr. Sarah Beaulieu who performed the search) were discovered in an unmarked cemetery on the grounds of the former Kamloops Indian Residential School, an existing bill to rename Orange Shirt Day to National Truth and Reconciliation Day and make it a statutory holiday was fast-tracked and passed by Parliament with unanimous consent.

In response to the media reports, there were calls and rallies across the country under the slogan #CancelCanadaDay. Many communities would go on to cancel official Canada Day festivities, with some citing COVID-19 concerns as the reason. According to Indigenous activist group Idle No More, by June 29, 2021, at least 50 municipalities across the country had decided to cancel Canada Day events that year.

Several cities on Canada Day saw marches "to denounce the legacy of residential schools", with thousands marching in Montreal to "acknowledge the genocide of Indigenous people".

An opinion piece by Kisha Supernant and Sean Carleton, published by the CBC, responded to denialists, stating that "[t]here is no big lie or deliberate hoax", but is instead "the complicated nature of what the TRC calls the 'complex truth' ".

Prime Minister Justin Trudeau directed that flags on all federal buildings be flown at half-mast. Lasting for over five months, it marked "the longest period in Canadian history that the flag has been at half-mast".

On June 2, 2021, the federal government pledged $27 million in immediate funding to the National Centre for Truth and Reconciliation to identify the unmarked graves. The provincial governments of British Columbia, Alberta, Saskatchewan, Manitoba and Ontario also pledged CA$12 million, $8 million, $2 million, $2.5 million and $10 million, respectively, to fund searches.

MPs Mumilaaq Qaqqaq and Charlie Angus called on Justice Minister David Lametti to launch an independent investigation on crimes against humanity in Canada. A month earlier, after Canada issued a joint statement to the United Nations Human Rights Council demanding China allow free access to Xinjiang to investigate reported human rights violations, China and its allies (Note: Here: "Russia, Belarus, Iran, North Korea, Syria and Venezuela") called on the UN to investigate crimes against Indigenous people in Canada, citing the preliminary discovery a month prior in Kamloops.

Lametti said in 2023 that he was open to outlawing residential school denialism. As of April 2025, his successor, Arif Virani, has not taken a position on the issue, stating he was considering "the options raised in [Kimberly Murray, the "independent adviser on unmarked graves",]’s interim report and looks forward to receiving her recommendation in the final report."

The Canadian School Boards Association asked for a Canada-wide curriculum on Indigenous history, to be taught from kindergarten to Grade 12. In New Brunswick, Education Minister Dominic Cardy said the education curriculum would be amended to teach about the province's Indigenous day schools.

The United Nations Human Rights Office and independent UN human rights experts called on Canada and the Holy See to investigate. Similar sentiments were echoed by the governments of China, Russia, Belarus, Iran, North Korea, Syria and Venezuela.

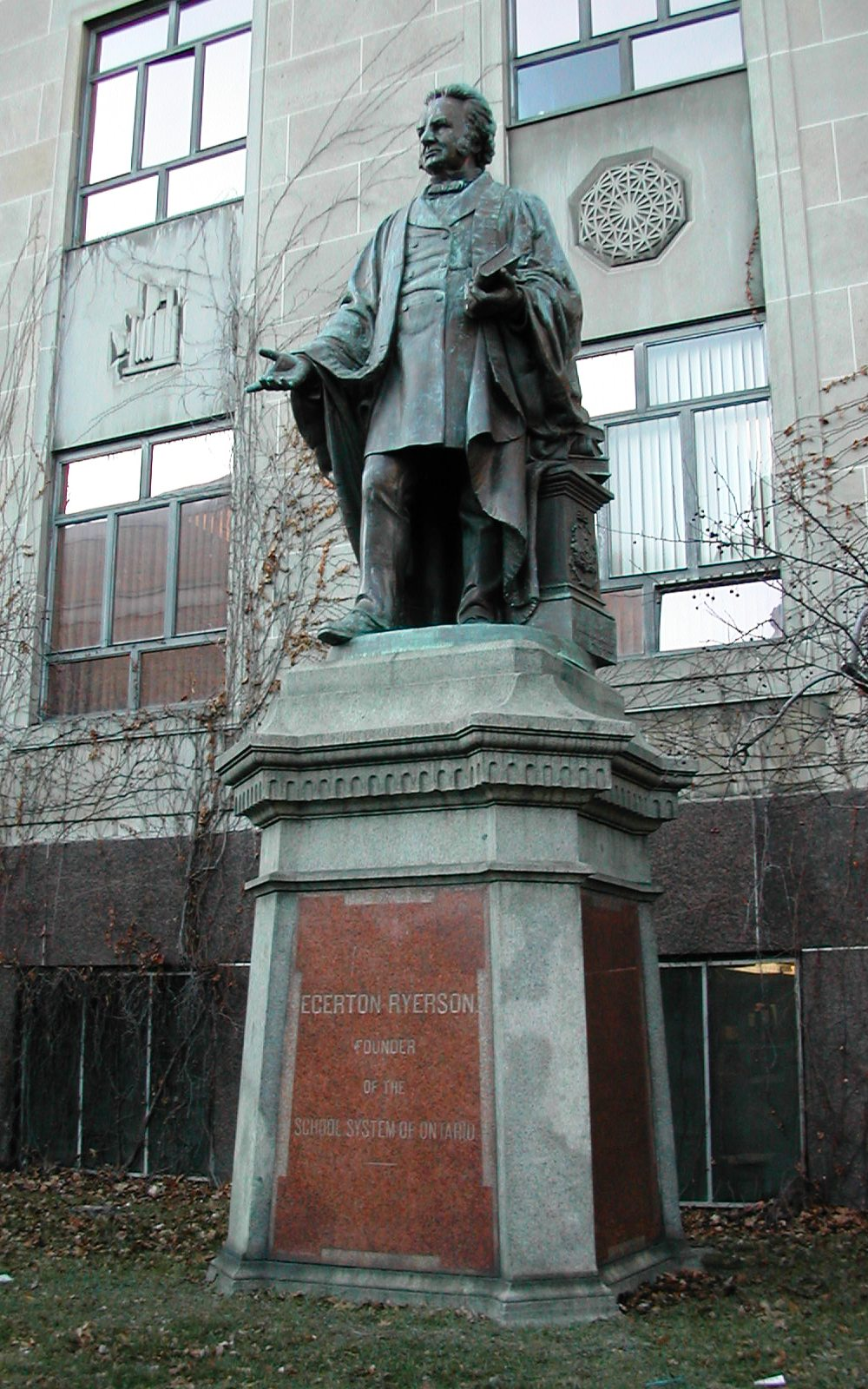
Statue of Egerton Ryerson, toppled on June 6, 2021 (2005 photo)

The discovery of suspected gravesites at Kamloops was followed by calls for name changes and the removal of monuments commemorating figures known for their colonial views or policies towards Indigenous peoples. These include monuments to Egerton Ryerson, John A. Macdonald, Hector-Louis Langevin, Oscar Blackburn, Vital-Justin Grandin, and James Cook.

A school named after Prince Charles was renamed, and a statue of Queen Victoria and another of Queen Elizabeth II were toppled by protesters.

In August 2025, an Angus Reid public opinion poll found that 63% of Canadians and 56% of Indigenous people think that further evidence through exhumation is necessary to accept that the remains of children are buried at the Kamloops site.

=== Church fires ===
By July 4, 2021 nearly two dozen churches, including eight on First Nations territories, had been burned, with community leaders, commentators, and Prime Minister Trudeau correlating the fires with the involvement of the Catholic and Anglican churches in operating residential schools. The writer Robert Jago identified religion as a point of full separation between indigenous and Canadian society, holding that "[i]t is a legitimate debate for First Nations to talk about removing Catholic churches from [indigenous] territories". Indigenous leaders, including Chief Clarence Louie of the Osoyoos Indian Band, as well as the prime minister and provincial officials condemned the suspected arsons.

In 2024, a CBC News investigation identified 33 churches that had burned since May 2021, including 24 that had been confirmed as arsons and two that had been ruled accidental. Of the arsons, nine resulted in arrests; "no clear motive has been established" in the incidents that resulted in criminal charges. The CBC investigation found that the fires and vandalism of other churches correlated with the increased publicity surround gravesites at residential schools. Royal Canadian Mounted Police information indicated that between May 2019 and May 2021, there were nine arsons at churches in Alberta; between June 2021 and September 2023, there were 29. Some fires have been tied to discontent with a failure to address the harm done by residential schools, while others–including a fire at a Coptic Orthodox church–have been identified as being wholly unrelated to the residential schools. At least 24 suspicious fires have been recorded, with two arson convictions – including one identified as unrelated to the residential school graves – made as of January 2024.

== Aftermath ==
=== Excavations ===
In August 2021, one of the first formal searches concluded at the former Shubenacadie Indian Residential School in Nova Scotia, the only residential school in the Maritimes. A team led by Saint Mary's University archaeologist Jonathan Fowler and Mi'kmaq ethnologist Roger Lewis, using GPR, LIDAR imagery, drone mapping, and electromagnetic induction, found no graves connected to the school. The anomalies detected were associated with earlier land use predating the school's 1929 opening by approximately a century.

In August 2023, the Minegoziibe Anishinabe (Pine Creek First Nation) in Manitoba announced the results of a four-week excavation of 14 anomalies detected by GPR in the basement of Our Lady of Seven Sorrows Catholic Church, on the grounds of the former Pine Creek Residential School. The dig, carried out by a team from Brandon University, found no evidence of human remains. Items recovered included animal bones and fire debris. Chief Derek Nepinak said the outcome took "nothing away from the difficult truths experienced by our families" and pledged that searches of the surrounding grounds would continue.

As of February 2025, Tk'emlups te Secwepemc received $12.1 million in federal funding for "field work, records searches and to secure the Residential School grounds" of Kamloops Indian Residential School. No forensic excavation has been conducted and no human remains have been confirmed at the site. Chief Rosanne Casimir described the question of whether to excavate as "unresolved," calling any such step "very intrusive" and requiring extensive community dialogue. In May 2024, on the third anniversary of the original announcement, the First Nation issued a statement referring to the 215 findings as "anomalies" rather than using the language of "children" or "confirmed remains" that had appeared in its 2021 press release.

In contrast, the Deninu Kue First Nation at Fort Resolution, Northwest Territories, confirmed the first physical discovery of remains directly linked to the post-2021 wave of searches. Guided by elders including the late Angus Beaulieu, who had identified Mission Island as a burial site, an archaeological team excavated seven unmarked graves in August 2025, five of which belonged to children and two to adults, at a site connected to the former St. Joseph's Residential School. The school had operated from 1903 to 1957; an earlier mission school had stood on Mission Island from 1857 to 1890. The identities of those buried and the circumstances of their deaths had not yet been determined as of August 2025. In a separate development connected to the same school, the remains of Alma Beaulieu, who had died at St. Joseph's in 1944 at the age of five, were exhumed and repatriated to her home community in Fort Smith on 20 October 2025 following years of advocacy by her 88-year-old sister Delphine Beaulieu.

=== Residential school denialism ===
In the years after the initial 2021 reports, a lack of evidence for the existence of mass unmarked graves has led some to allege a "mass grave hoax". This view has been criticized as downplaying the validity of potential grave sites, and has been described as residential school denialism.

External videos
- "Mythbusting Residential Schools were well-intentioned" (2024) – Sean Carleton - University of Manitoba (2:43 min)

In 2021, in the wake of the discovery of over 200 anomalies by ground-penetrating radar at the former Kamloops Indian Residential School which were labelled as potential unmarked graves, many critics cite the lack of evidence for true gravesites as supporting their claims that reported death tolls have been inflated. Critics have claimed that mainstream media reported the presence of "mass graves" at residential school sites despite lack of archaeological evidence, in order to mislead the public. This has been described as the "Mass Grave Hoax". This has also resulted in critics going to the ground on which the anomalies were discovered, carrying shovels, attempting to prove that there are no human remains on the site. On National Truth and Reconciliation Day in 2023, then Prime Minister Justin Trudeau stated that denialism was on the rise after disputes regarding the conclusiveness of the evidence of Indian residential schools gravesite discoveries.

The National Post wrote:

The question of mass graves ... remains unresolved ... When anomalies were later investigated at other sites with inconclusive results, skepticism grew—not about the existence of abuse, but about the accuracy of journalism. This is the vacuum into which "denialism" has been projected: a space where open inquiry is mistaken for malice.

Kisha Supernant and Sean Carleton writing for the CBC wrote in response that:

The day before the Kamloops anniversary, the National Post published a column that suggested the public outcry over the past year was mainly the result of some journalists reporting the findings as "mass graves." Communities have been clear that what is being identified are potential unmarked graves, but the column jumped on the error made by some journalists to then suggest that much of the response — both in Canada and around the world — was erroneous and unjustified.

Supernant and Carleton added that "an error made by some journalists does not change the fact that we already know more than 4,000 Indigenous children and youth died in Canada's Indian Residential Schools."

External videos
- "What Remains: Exposing the Kamloops Mass Grave Deceptions" (2025) – IRSRG (108 min)

In 2022, Frances Widdowson has voiced disagreement with the TRC's conclusion that the schools were genocidal, and stated that the residential school system had educational benefits despite its harms. She acknowledges that residential schools hurt people and that children died, but she disagrees with the findings about potential graves at the Kamloops Indian Residential School. In 2025, she co-produced a documentary about residential school gravesites titled What Remains: Exposing the Kamloops Mass Grave Deception's Impact on Powell River.

In 2025, Dallas Brodie made posts on X that read in part: "The number of confirmed child burials at the former Kamloops Indian Residential School site is zero. Zero. No one should be afraid of the truth. Not lawyers, their governing bodies, or anyone else." The Union of British Columbia Indian Chiefs responded with a statement condemning the posts and calling on Brodie to apologize "for promoting abhorrent rhetoric which minimizes the harms of Residential Schools and for misleading and emboldening the public against Indigenous people". On March 7, 2025, Brodie was removed from the Conservative Party of BC caucus as a result of her decision to publicly mock and belittle testimony from former residential school students.

== Media reporting in 2021 ==
"Children who never returned from residential schools" were the Canadian Newsmakers of the Year in 2021, an annual designation voted by a nationwide survey of editors and published by the Canadian Press.

In July 2021, a New York Times article "'Horrible History'" sparked interest in the matter. In May 2022, the National Post article "The year of the graves" said that despite the saturation of news coverage and their consequences, nothing new had been added to the public record that was not already known and that "it wasn't the Indigenous people directly involved who made the disturbing claims that ended up in the headlines".

== See also ==
- Christianity and colonialism
- Genocide recognition politics § Canada
- List of Indian residential schools in Canada
- Duplessis Orphans
