= 2021 Canadian church burnings =

Arsons and fires in Canada

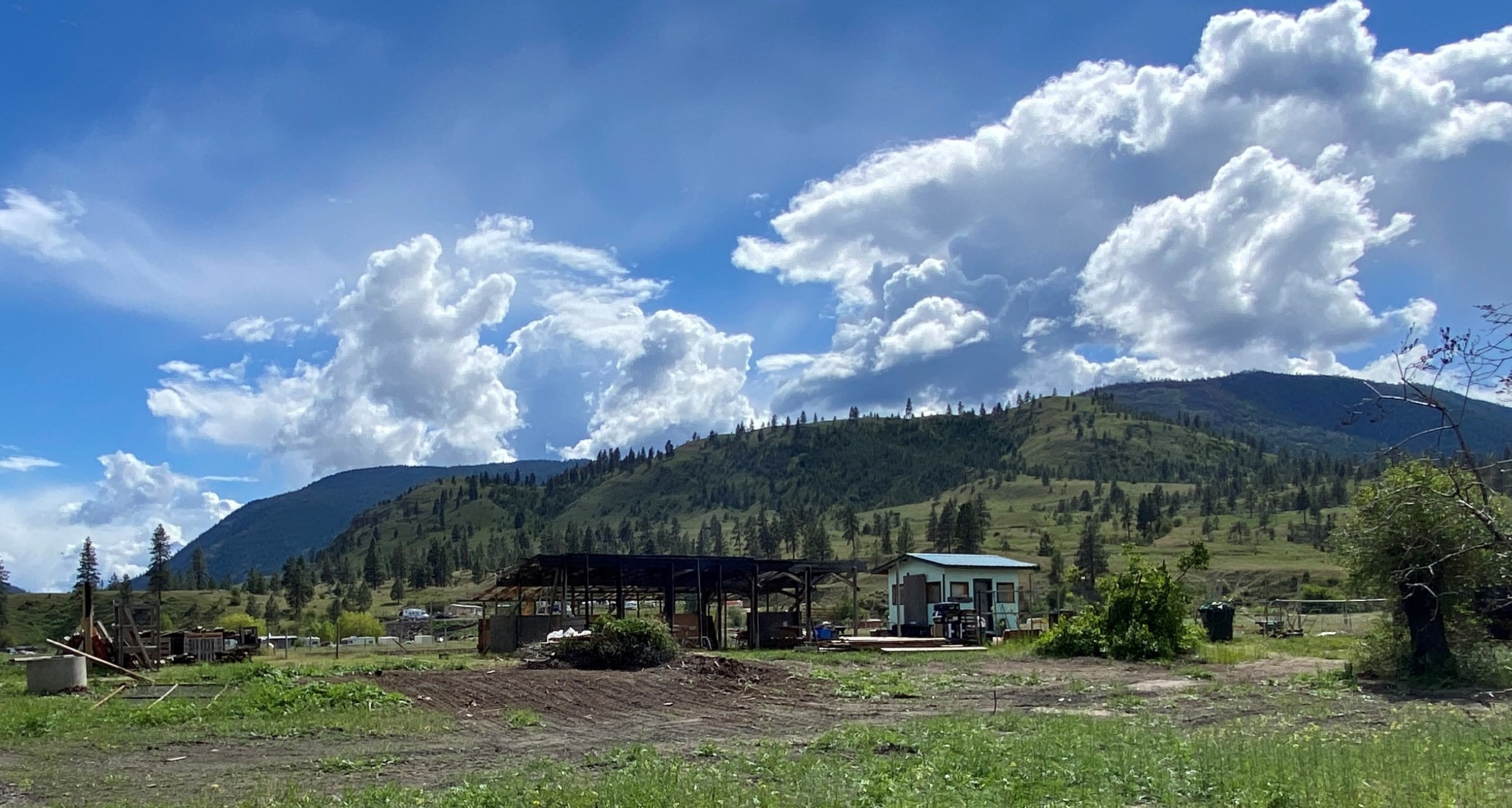
- Charred remains of Sacred Heart Mission, Penticton
- Location: British Columbia, Alberta, Saskatchewan, Northwest Territories, and Nova Scotia, Canada
- Date: Began June 2021
- Target: Christian church buildings
- Attack type: Church arson, vandalism
- Deaths: 0
- Injuries: 0
- Perpetrator: Unknown
- Motive: Most cases unknown, mental illness (Surrey)
- Convictions: 2

Starting in June 2021, a series of church arsons and suspicious fires damaged or destroyed multiple Christian churches in Canada. Coincident with the fires, vandalism and other destructive events also damaged churches in Canada, primarily in British Columbia.

Canadian government officials, church members, and Canadian First Nations leaders have speculated that the fires and other acts of vandalism have been reactions to the reported discovery of unmarked graves at Canadian Indian residential school sites in May 2021. In July 2021, Canadian Prime Minister Justin Trudeau called for an end to the fires. As of 2024, no conclusive motive for the majority of the arsons has been formally identified by government investigators. A fire at a Coptic Orthodox church was determined to be the result of mental illness and unrelated to the residential schools, resulting in a conviction. One other fire resulted in another conviction.

A report by CBC News in 2024 identified 24 arsons at Christian churches in Canada between May 2021 and December 2023, with other cases still under investigation. Of the arsons, nine resulted in arrests, with law enforcement not identifying a motive in incidents resulting in criminal charges. The investigation identified that the church arsons began following the announcement of potential unmarked gravesites at the site of the former Kamloops Indian Residential School. It cited community leaders and an Indigenous history research that identified a relationship between the arsons and anger regarding the gravesites; it quoted one law enforcement official as saying that suspected motivations appeared "as varied as the people themselves", who came "from all walks of civil life, many different backgrounds".

== Church burnings and defacing ==
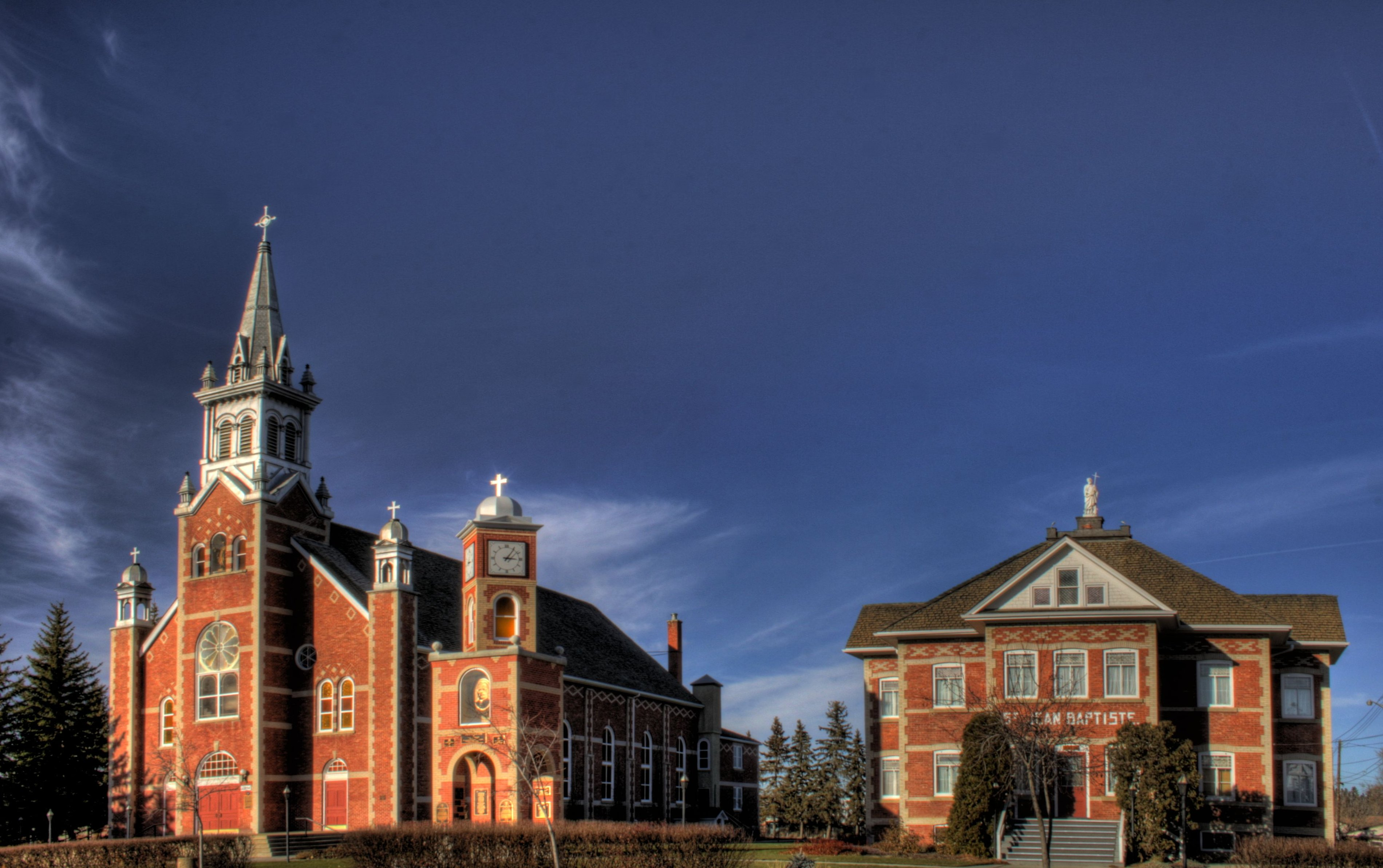
St. Jean Baptiste Church in Morinville, Alberta, was among the fires, burning completely on June 30.

On June 21, 2021, two Catholic church buildings in British Columbia were destroyed in fires: Sacred Heart Mission Church of Penticton and St. Gregory Mission Church on Osoyoos land. St. Gregory's Church was constructed in 1910. The Osoyoos fire was about 40 kilometres away from the Penticton fire and began a few hours later. As of January 2024, neither fire had resulted in criminal charges. The congregation at Osoyoos began utilizing the band council office on Sundays and do not intend to rebuild their church. After further fires near Penticton following reports of over 900 unmarked graves discovered at former Canadian Indian residential school sites, Royal Canadian Mounted Police sergeant Jason Bayda said that the fires being at "four churches, all Catholic, all on indigenous land, that in itself is extremely suspicious".

On June 26, another two British Columbian Catholic churches–St. Ann's Church and Our Lady of Lourdes Catholic Church serving Chopaka–were also destroyed by fires declared "suspicious" by police. A fire at an Anglican church was also discovered that day, but it was extinguished with minimal damage. On June 28, Siksika Nation's Catholic church in Alberta was damaged. The same day, the RCMP announced that their "preliminary investigation" into the Siksika fire had indicated the fire was "deliberately set" and announced further investigation with the provincial fire inspector into its cause.

St. Kateri Tekakwitha Church in Indian Brook, Nova Scotia, suffered a fire causing damage to the building on June 30, 2021. Police described the fire at St. Kateri Tekakwitha Church as "suspicious" and announced an investigation, adding that the church fires in western Canada were "something that our investigators will certainly be aware of when they're conducting this investigation". Another fire occurred on June 30, 2021, at St. Jean Baptiste Church in Morinville, Alberta. The fire was immediately deemed suspicious by investigators, but no charges have been made in relation to the fire as of 2024. The church, which hosted its first service in 1908, was completely destroyed. Fundraising by the congregation aimed to support construction on a new church building, to begin in spring 2024 with the goal of completing by Christmas in 2025. The destroyed church's bells were recovered and are set to be installed in the new church.

Two fires on the night of July 1–2 destroyed an Anglican church on native land and damaged another. The fire that destroyed the abandoned 108-year-old St. Paul's Anglican Church of New Hazelton, British Columbia, was the second suspicious fire at that church in a week; a smaller fire had damaged a door. Authorities expressed concern over the fires, noting the wildfires risk. A separate fire, also in British Columbia, damaged a portion of the St. Columba Anglican Church in Tofino. A RCMP investigation was launched shortly after what police initially determined to be an "incendiary device" was thrown through the window of St. Patrick Co-Cathedral in Yellowknife, resulting in moderate damage.

The Holy Trinity Roman Catholic Church in Redberry Lake burned to the ground on the afternoon of July 8; this fire was also called "suspicious" by the RCMP. On July 9, the Our Lady of Mercy Roman Catholic Church was destroyed by arson. The church was located in the Kehewin Cree Nation, south of Bonnyville, and was slated for demolition after it was left vacant for "several years". A youth was arrested by the Bonnyville RCMP and charged for the arson. The local youth was released with a court date set for September 2021 and later convicted for the arson.

One church fire was determined to be unrelated to the reported discoveries of gravesites at residential schools. The Coptic Orthodox church of St. George in Surrey, British Columbia, was destroyed by a fire on July 19, 2021. A woman was later convicted and sentenced to jail time for the arson, with mental illness unrelated to the potential unmarked gravesites identified as the cause of her actions.

The Catholic Civil Rights League of Canada has a Church Attacks Database on their website which documents various incidents involving Catholic churches in Canada, such as vandalism of stained-glass windows, acts of desecration, and church burnings. According to their data at least 85 Catholic churches were damaged by fire or vandalism since May 27, 2021. A report released by CBC News in January 2024 identified 24 arsons and five suspected arsons at Christian churches in Canada after May 2021. Of the 24 arsons, nine resulted in arrests, with law enforcement not identifying a motive in incidents resulting in criminal charges, though police reported awareness of "potential motivators". Two fires at Canadian churches during the May 2021–December 2023 period covered by the CBC report were ruled accidental by investigators; 14 churches were destroyed by fires in the period between January 1, 2019 and May 2021. Two other incidents of church fires, both in rural Alberta during 2023, resulted in two pairs of people receiving criminal charges. Roughly half of the fires occurred at Catholic churches, with fires at churches of the United Church of Canada, Anglican Church of Canada, and evangelical churches also reported. As of January 2024, 12 people were charged in relation to the arsons. Of these, six were from Indigenous communities where churches were burned and one–the youth charged in relation to the Kehewin Cree church fire–was convicted. The journalist Tanya Talaga, in her 2024 book The Knowing, reported that there 68 churches that were burned, desecrated, or vandalized on the prairies during the two months after the Kamloops announcement. She cited that number as from a presentation by the researcher Leah Redcrow of the Saddle Creek First Nation; Redcrow called for church burnings to stop, since they might endanger documents needed to learn more about residential school history.^{:156-7}

== Speculated motives ==
Several motives have been speculated regarding the arsons. In June 2021, following the Penticton and Osoyoos fires, government investigators suggested possible motives included the targeting of Indigenous communities and anger towards the Catholic Church over their role in operating residential schools between 1883 and 1996. In July 2021, after additional fires, fire chiefs pointed to the fires beginning on National Indigenous Peoples Day when asserting that the fires were not coincidental.

A July 2021 story in The Wall Street Journal noted that nobody had claimed responsibility for the fires and added that both Canadian law enforcement and politicians speculated "the churches are being targeted by those angry about the recent discovery of unmarked graves", but that Canadian police did not have evidence of a connection "in most cases".

The January 2024 CBC News investigation cited community leaders and an Indigenous history research that identified a relationship between the arsons and anger regarding the gravesites. The same investigation quoted one law enforcement official as saying that suspected motivations appeared "as varied as the people themselves", who came "from all walks of civil life, many different backgrounds". The CBC News investigation identified that the church arsons began following the announcement of potential unmarked gravesites at the site of the former Kamloops Indian Residential School. Scholar of Indigenous Canadian history Paulina Johnson commented on the church fires, saying "for many Indigenous peoples, it gives them a voice, because for the longest time Canada hasn't really hasn't actually acknowledged us", adding she believed that the failure to address injustices against Indigenous peoples was responsible for the church fires.

== Reactions ==
=== Condemnation ===
Chief Greg Gabriel of the Penticton Indian Band expressed "anger" at the fires, stating that any act of arson was "unacceptable". Grand Chief Stewart Philip of the Union of BC Indian Chiefs and Chief Clarence Louie of the Osoyoos Indian Band denounced the fires, but said they were "not really surprising" following the discovery of unmarked graves at residential schools. Louie declared the fires "a criminal act" and "arson". Grand Chief Arthur Noskey of the Treaty 8 First Nations of Alberta and Loon River First Nation said the churches needed protecting as "potential evidence sites" and that sites of former residential schools need to be protected. Chief Keith Crow of the Lower Similkameen Indian Band (location of the Chopaka church) stated "I'm angry ... I don't see any positive coming from this and it's going to be tough."

Alberta Premier Jason Kenney declared on June 30 that the Morinville fire "appears to have been a criminal act of hate inspired violence." He also called the fire a "violent hate crime targeting the Catholic community".

On July 2, Prime Minister Justin Trudeau called the vandalism and arson attacks targeting Canadian churches "unacceptable and wrong", while later adding that the anger directed towards the church was "fully understandable" and "people have gone decades and even generations living with intergenerational trauma, with outcomes and institutional racism that has created extreme difficulties for Indigenous peoples across this country that are also the legacy of residential schools". Trudeau, in his comments on the fires, added that the anger towards the Catholic Church was "fully understandable given the shameful history".

Former chief Chastity Daniels of the Gitwangak First Nation condemned the July 1 fire at St. Paul's Anglican Church saying "it wasn't a Catholic church, it was an Anglican church and there's nothing but good memories in that church for our community." A group of residential school survivors called for people to stop burning and defacing churches. Jenn Allan-Riley, a Sixties Scoop survivor and daughter of a residential school survivor, stated that "Burning down churches is not in solidarity with us Indigenous people" and "we do not destroy other people's places of worship".

=== Support for the burnings ===
Harsha Walia, the executive director of the British Columbia Civil Liberties Association responded to reports of fires at indigenous Catholic parishes with a tweet on June 30 that read "burn it all down". Some members of the First Nations community criticized her but the Union of British Columbia Indian Chiefs expressed support for her without mentioning the controversial tweet. She resigned as executive director of the BC Civil Liberties Association over the issue on July 16, 2021.

== See also ==
- Residential school denialism
- Heritage conservation in Canada
