= Tkʼemlúps te Secwépemc =

First Nation government in British Columbia, Canada

Coordinates: 50°43′00″N 120°16′00″W

Tkʼemlúps te Secwépemc Band No. 688
- People: Secwepemc

Land
- Main reserve: Kamloops 1
- Other reserve(s): Hihium Lake 6; Kamloops 2; Kamloops 3; Kamloops 4; Kamloops 5
- Land area: 134.159 (51¾ sq. mi.) km^{2}

Population (2025)
- On reserve: 545
- On other land: 106
- Off reserve: 944
- Total population: 1595

Government
- Chief: Rosanne Casimir
- Council: Thomas Blank; Nikki Fraser; Boyd Gottfriedson; Daylin Malloy; David Manuel; Vicki W. Manuel; Myron Ray Alphonse Thomas

Tribal Council
- Shuswap Nation Tribal Council

Website
- https://tkemlups.ca

Tkʼemlúps te Secwépemc (Shuswap pronunciation: [tkʼəmˈlups tə səˈxʷɛpəmx]), abbreviated TteS and previously known as the Kamloops Indian Band, is a First Nations government within the Shuswap Nation Tribal Council, which represents ten of the seventeen Secwepemc band governments, all in the southern Central Interior region, spanning the Thompson and Shuswap districts. It is one of the largest of the 17 groups into which the Secwepemc (Shuswap) nation was divided when the Colony of British Columbia established an Indian reserve system in the 1860s.

The Chief of TteS is referred to as the Kúkpi7.

== History ==
Prior to European colonization of the Americas, the Secwepemc occupied traditional territory spanning approximately 145,000 square kilometres (56,000 sq mi), known as Secwepemcúl̓ecw in Secwepemctsín.

The Secwepemc settlement of Tkʼemlups, meaning "river junction," was an economically important centre within the area that later came to be the British Columbian Interior long before European arrival in North America. The reason was its very favourable location at the confluence of two major navigable rivers, the South Thompson River and the North Thompson. Europeans who settled in the area brought the native name into the English language as Kamloops, which became the name of Fort Kamloops, one of the main posts of the Hudson's Bay Company (originally built by the North West Company).

Leaders of the Kamloops band of Secwepemc were notable in the history of the colonization of British Columbia. Around 1800, Kwaʼlila was a chief who invited his better-known nephew Nicola to the Nicola Valley and passed on the mantle of the Kamloops chieftaincy. Nicola was the presiding chief at Kamloops, and also jointly Grand Chief of the Okanagan people, during the Fraser Canyon War and the associated troubles of the Okanagan Trail, and was made a magistrate enforcing British law by Governor James Douglas. Nicola's son Chilliheetza, or Txelexitsa, figured prominently in native/colonist politics in the later 19th Century, as have other chiefs of the Kamloops band since. Other notable Contact-era chiefs were Chief Tranquille and Chief Lolo.

The territory that would later become TteS was part of the Thompson River District of the North West Company when the company officially defined its territory west of the Rocky Mountains in 1815.After unsuccessfully recruiting local indigenous populations to hunt and trap for them, the North West Company began a practice of importing Haudenosaunee from around Montreal to hunt and trap, with an expectation that they would teach the local populations how to do so as well. This led to at least two violent confrontations between the North West Company and local indigenous people during the 1810s.

The Kamloops Indian Residential School was established on the Nation's territory in 1890, and was run by the Catholic Church until 1969 as part of the Canadian Indian residential school system, before being taken over by the federal government and used as a day school. At one point, the school was the largest in the residential school system, with up to 500 students attending at any given time. The school closed in 1978, but the building remains near a bend in the South Thompson River on Kamloops Indian Reserve No. 1. In May 2021, according to a source referencing TteS Kukpi7 Rosanne Casimir's news release, the remains of 215 children, including some as young as three years old, were found buried on the site of the former residential school. Work is being done to see if any records of these deaths can be found in local museums, and to inform community members who had family that attended the school, to provide help dealing with the discovery. Another source limits the discovery to having identified approximately 200 potential burial sites using ground penetrating radar techniques, citing more forensic investigation and excavation work needing to be done.

The city of Kamloops is now a major regional urban centre with circa 92,000 residents. The Kamloops Indian Band's business district functions economically as a part of the city, though it is separately administered by the Band. The golf course and resort/recreational community of Sun Rivers is located on the main Kamloops Reserve.

Controversy over the Sun Peaks Resort in regard to native title has involved Kamloops band members.

== Demographics ==
As of February 2024, the band has 1,550 members living on and off its 33,150-acre (134.2 km^{2}) reserve. It has active language and cultural programs and its Skʼelep School of Excellence is one of the largest First Nations elementary schools in British Columbia (Skʼelep is the Shuswap language name for "the Trickster", Coyote).

== Indian Reserves ==
Some of the Indian Reserves under the administration of TteS include:

- Kamloops Indian Reserve No. 1, confluence of the South and North Thompson Rivers, adjacent to and within the City of Kamloops, 13,283.2 hectares (51 1/4 sq mi). This reserve is what is meant by the common name "Kamloops Indian Reserve". The community of Sun Rivers, British Columbia is located on this reserve.
- Kamloops Indian Reserve No. 2, at outlet of Trapp Lake, 6.0 ha (14 3/4 acres).
- Kamloops Indian Reserve No. 3, on the west shore of Trapp Lake, 3.0 ha (7 1/2 acres).
- Kamloops Indian Reserve No. 4, on the right bank of the North Thompson River about 24 miles north of Kamloops., 72.8 hectares (180 acres).
- Kamloops Indian Reserve No. 5, on the north shore of Heffley Lake, 18.6 ha (46 acres).
- Hihium Lake 6 (shared between Upper Nicola, Lower Nicola, Bonaparte and Tkʼemlups (Kamloops) Bands), 78 acres
