= Residential school =

Residential school may refer to:

- American Indian boarding schools
- Canadian Indian residential school system
  - Residential school denialism
- Boarding school
- Residential treatment center for people with addictions or severe mental illnesses
- Therapeutic boarding school
