= Frances Widdowson =

Canadian political scientist (born 1966)

- Born: 1966 (age 59–60); British Hong Kong

Academic background
- Education: University of Victoria (BA, MA); York University (PhD)

Academic work
- Discipline: Political science
- Sub-discipline: Indigenous Policy
- Institutions: Mount Royal University; Grenfell Campus, Memorial University of Newfoundland

Frances Widdowson (born 1966) is a Canadian political scientist. She was an associate professor in the department of economics, justice, and policy studies at Mount Royal University from 2008 until her termination in 2021, after an investigation into claims of harassment against a faculty member.

Widdowson is known for her skepticism that First Nations children are buried at the Kamloops Residential School in British Columbia.

== Education ==
Widdowson completed her Doctor of Philosophy in political science from York University in 2008.

== Career ==
Widdowson worked as a policy analyst for the government of the Northwest Territories. While in Yellowknife, she became interested in researching Canada's various policies regarding Indigenous peoples, directing her attention towards what she calls the "Aboriginal industry", which includes non-Indigenous lawyers and consultants acting as intermediaries between the government and Indigenous communities. She believes this industry prioritizes compensation and funding discussions over the quality of services provided and that they engage in lengthy legal battles, often lasting decades, during which government personnel change and the needs of the Indigenous communities are overlooked, while the intermediaries profit significantly from the settlements.

In 2008, she published the book Disrobing the Aboriginal Industry with Albert Howard, which discussed these issues. Peter Kulchyski, professor of Indigenous studies at the University of Manitoba, writing for Canadian Dimension, gave the book a negative review, commenting, "There are moments, however, when their ethnocentrism does slide over into overt racism, like when they begin chapter ten, on traditional knowledge, with a discussion of the book Why Cats Paint, effectively implying that elders have the same absence of ability to think as cats have to create art", and that the authors "blithely ignore what is historically inconvenient to their argument—namely, history".

Widdowson joined the faculty of Mount Royal University (MRU) in 2008; she received tenure in 2011.

While working at MRU, Widdowson questioned the purpose of the Truth and Reconciliation Commission of Canada (TRC), particularly regarding residential schooling. She has voiced disagreement with the TRC's conclusion that the schools were "genocidal" as well as stating that the residential school system had educational benefits, despite their harms.

In 2020, she said the Black Lives Matter movement cause "destroyed" the university.

Considered a champion of free speech by some, Widdowson and a number of her colleagues took part in a "Twitter War" in 2020. This led to filings of a series of official complaints about harassment and bullying by Widdowson as well as her colleagues. Several investigations determined that Widdowson had made some tweets that constituted harassment and that some of the complaints by Widdowson against her colleagues were substantiated. In July 2021, Widdowson filed a complaint against a colleague regarding his tweets. An investigation concluded in November 2021 that the tweets did not amount to harassment, and it deemed Widdowson's complaint to be "malicious, frivolous, vexatious, and made in bad faith". Widdowson was fired from MRU in December 2021. In July 2024, an arbitrator ruled that the firing was disproportionate to Widdowson's actions.

In January 2023, the University of Lethbridge (U of L) canceled a guest lecture by Widdowson, titled "How Does Woke-ism Threaten Academic Freedom?", after complaints by students and faculty. She gave her lecture at the Lethbridge Public Library instead. In July, Widdowson sued the U of L for the cancellation. The lawsuit was filed by the Justice Centre for Constitutional Freedoms.

As of 2022, Widdowson was working on a manuscript entitled The Woke Academy: How Advocacy Studies Murder Academic Disciplines and Effective Policy Development.

Widdowson is skeptical of certain claims regarding the Indian residential school system, challenging assertions that First Nations children are buried at the Kamloops Residential School in the absence of forensic confirmation, and she has repeatedly questioned the conclusiveness of ground-penetrating radar (GPR) used to identify potential graves. She has written that "GPR is incredibly inaccurate and is completely inconclusive. You must excavate if you're going to find what is beneath the soil." Sean Carleton, professor of Indigenous studies at the University of Manitoba, has said that this was "incorrect technically in archeological work" and noted that GPR is a useful tool, especially when used in combination with historical records indicating a cemetery, along with firsthand testimony of survivors of Kamloops. Carleton further explained: "Much of this work is being done in graveyards that have lost their markings, and that work, the pattern work that can be done can confirm based on existing graves that these are fairly certain."

In May 2025, Widdowson co-produced a documentary about Canadian Indian residential school gravesites, titled What Remains: Exposing the Kamloops Mass Grave Deception's Impact on Powell River.

She has attended several campus events in British Columbia related to the residential school gravesites and has often been challenged by counter-protesters, requiring a police presence. On September 29, 2026, she was arrested during a National Day for Truth and Reconciliation event at the University of Victoria, after refusing to leave despite requests from the Greater Victoria Public Safety Unit. Widdowson had previously been charged with trespassing on the university grounds, in December 2025; the charges were stayed in June 2026.

== Awards and honours ==
Widdowson's book Disrobing the Aboriginal Industry was short-listed for the 2008 Donner Prize.

== Personal life ==
Widdowson is married to the researcher Albert Howard.

== Books ==
- Disrobing the Aboriginal Industry: The Deception behind Indigenous Cultural Preservation with Albert Howard (2008)
- Approaches to Aboriginal Education in Canada: Searching for Solutions editor (2013)
- Separate but Unequal: How Parallelist Ideology Conceals Indigenous Dependency (2019)
- Indigenizing the University: Diverse Perspectives editor (2021)
