= Julien-Augustin Bédard =

Julien-Augustin Bédard (20 April 1858-20 December 1932) was a Canadian Roman Catholic priest, missionary, and educator. A member of the Missionary Oblates of Mary Immaculate, Bédard was sent to British Columbia in 1887. He took part in negotiations with the federal government to establish the Kamloops Indian Residential School.
