= Rosanne Casimir =

Kúkpi7 (Chief) of the Tk'emlúps te Secwépemc

Rosanne Casimir OBC

Kúkpi7 of Tkʼemlúps te Secwépemc
- Incumbent
- Assumed office November 2018
- Preceded by: Fred Seymour

Rosanne Casimir OBC is the Kúkpi7 (/ˈkukpiʔ/: Chief) of the Tkʼemlúps te Secwépemc. She is the third woman to serve as Kúkpi7. During her tenure, 200 targets of interest were discovered with ground-penetrating radar on the site of the former Kamloops Indian Residential School. Some researchers have claimed unmarked child graves, but forensic investigation with excavation has not been done to confirm these claims.

== Career ==
Casimir first ran for election as Kúkpi7 in 2018. She succeeded the previous office-holder Fred Seymour, who did not seek re-election, becoming the third woman to hold the office. She had previously served as a Tk’emlups councillor for nine years, holding portfolios for land, taxation and housing. One of her ancestors is a previous Tk’emlups chief Louis Clexlixqen (1852 -1915).

During her tenure as Kúkpi7, the remains of 215 children were theorized to have been buried on the site of the former Kamloops Indian Residential School. In May 2021, according to a source referencing TteS Kukpi7 Rosanne Casimir's news release, ground penetrating radar detected disturbed soil and a theory was put forth that the remains of 215 children, including some as young as three years old, were found buried on the site of the former residential school. In the press release issued by Casimir, stated that: “We are not here for retaliation. We are here for truth telling.”

In October 2021, Prime Minister Justin Trudeau issued a formal apology to indigenous leaders, including Kúkpi7 Casimir, since he decided to not formally participate in Canada's first National Day for Truth and Reconciliation. This was despite having received two invitations from the Tk’emlúps te Secwépemc Nation.

In November 2021, Casimir was elected for another three year term as Kúkpi7 (Chief) of the Tk’emlúps te Secwépemc. Of the 475 eligible ballots cast, 245 were in support of Casimir.

== Awards and recognition ==
In 2022, Castanet News selected Casimir as Person of the Year 2021 and was made a Member of the Order of British Columbia. She is a member of the board of directors of the British Columbia Assembly of First Nations.

== Personal life ==
She is married and has two children and one step-child.
