= Residential school denialism =

Denialism regarding Canadian residential schools

Residential school denialism is negationist ideology that trivializes, downplays, or misrepresents the effects of the Canadian Indian residential school system. Despite decades of recognition and acknowledgments, denialist claims remain a factor within Canadian society. Residential school denialism often includes claims that the number of reported deaths has been inflated by the "reconciliation industry", that there were only isolated cases of child sexual abuse, and that many survivors are untrustworthy or are merely seeking compensation.

Denialism is a perspective maintained by a small group of academics, researchers, and publications that contend the school system was a well-intentioned "civilizing mission", a progressive form of state intervention that provided education and benefited students. Denialism is often presented in a pseudo-scholarly manner. Organizations such as the "Indian Residential Schools Research Group" (IRSRG) have been created to "cast doubt on the residential schools' harmful legacy".

A period of redress began with the formation of the Truth and Reconciliation Commission of Canada by the Government of Canada on June 1, 2008. This was followed, 10 days later, with a formal apology by the then Prime Minister Stephen Harper.

This commission led to the acknowledgment of cultural genocide and settlement agreements. Residential school denialism has sparked policy debates, including proposals that the Government of Canada criminalize residential school denialism under hate speech laws. However, legal scholars have previously asserted that legislation restricting "freedom of expression" would likely not survive a constitutional challenge under the Canadian Charter.

== Causes ==
The great aim of our legislation (Indian Act) has been to do away with the tribal system and assimilate the Indian people in all respects with the other inhabitants of the Dominion as speedily as they are fit to change.

— Prime Minister of Canada - Sir John A Macdonald (1887)

Residential school denialism does not deny the existence of Canadian Indian residential schools; but it misinterprets, excuses, and downplays the impact of these schools on survivors and Indigenous communities. Support for residential school denialism can be motivated by many beliefs. Many subscribe to the ideology of residential school denialism due to the belief that the Indigenous peoples of Canada need to be continually assimilated into settler colonial culture in order for them to meaningfully participate in society. Despite current views that might define the system of residential schools as racist or genocidal, some scholars contend that they were seen as progressive at the time, a form of state intervention which helped integration into the dominant society that emphasized sedentary living, agriculture, and education.

Many also believe in what Lee Maracle termed the "myth of benevolence" which describes the myth that Indigenous peoples receive extensive access to many social services which settlers and immigrants do not receive. Those who believe in the myth of benevolence attribute this to an "opportunistic culture" among Indigenous peoples, enabled through freeloading on Canadian government and society.

External audio
- "What's fuelling residential school denialism?" (2026) – CBC News (32:05min)

Frances Widdowson and Albert Howard's Disrobing the Aboriginal Industry: The Deception Behind Indigenous Cultural Preservation claims that there exists an "Aboriginal Industry" composed of corrupt figures in Aboriginal leadership including lawyers, scholars, and consultants, and that these leaders are ineffective at furthering the development of Indigenous communities, while posing a threat to educational freedom and freedom of speech.

In 2022, Gregory Stanton, former president of the International Association of Genocide Scholars, issued a report stating Canada is in the "denial stage" of the ten stages of genocide: "The perpetrators ... deny that they committed any crimes".

== Methodology ==
External videos
- "Mythbusting Residential Schools were well-intentioned" (2024) – Sean Carleton - University of Manitoba (2:43 min)

Canadian history has evolved significantly over the years, with early interpretations often downplaying or denying the extent of violence and harm inflicted on Indigenous peoples. Kimberly Murray, from the Office of the Independent Special Interlocutor, released a report in 2023 stating: "a core group of Canadians continue to defend the Indian Residential Schools System … some still deny that children suffered physical, sexual, psychological, cultural, and spiritual abuses, despite the TRC's indisputable evidence to the contrary. Others try to deny and minimize the destructive impacts of the Indian Residential Schools. They believe Canada's historical myth that the nation has treated Indigenous Peoples with benevolence and generosity is true."

Murray's report prompted Leah Gazan, an NDP Member of Parliament, to introduce Bill C-413 in 2024, which would ban residential school denialism. Although a substantial portion of the Canadian public support criminalizing residential school denialism, legal scholars have previously asserted that a bill of this nature probably would not pass a constitutional challenge under the Canadian Charter.

Sean Carleton and Andrew Woolford contend that dissent and debate from what they name as "the fringe" are actually strategies used by genocide denialists to create doubt and undermine consensus. In response, Ian Gentles has expressed concern over what he referred to as academic "activists" stating that discussing and debating genocide is actually a "tool of genocide". Scholars such as Christopher Dummitt, Margaret MacMillan, Terry Copp, Frédéric Bastien, J. L. Granatstein, Robert J. Young and Susan Mann reiterate that the government's documented goal was integration, not elimination. They criticized attempts to shut down debate or discredit dissent as well as portraying those who disagree or diverge from activist language as prejudiced or outdated.

Specific residential school reports and survivor testimonies are often cherry picked in order to support denialists' claims. Political scientist Tom Flanagan and journalist Christian Paul Champion best selling publication Grave Error: How The Media Misled Us (and the Truth about Residential Schools), has been described as "collection of essays...which accuses the media of perpetuating a false narrative of residential schools and questions the findings of the Truth and Reconciliation Commission".

== Incidents ==
The Canadian Museum for Human Rights (CMHR) received criticism on its opening in 2014 because it did not use the term genocide to describe the history of colonialism in Canada. Two years after its opening, Rita K. Dhamoon critiqued the museum's focus on the Holocaust, frame of residential schools as assimilationist and not genocidal, and denial of the genocidal nature of settler colonialism. In 2019, the museum reversed its policy and officially recognizes genocide of Indigenous peoples in Canada in its content.

In 2021, Senator Lynn Beyak generated controversy and was accused of genocide denial in the Canadian Indian residential school system after she voiced disapproval of the final Truth and Reconciliation Commission of Canada report, saying that it had omitted the positives of the schools. Similarly, former Conservative Party leader Erin O'Toole said that the residential school system educated Indigenous children, but then changed his view: "The system was intended to remove children from the influence of their homes, families, traditions, and cultures". Former newspaper publisher Conrad Black and others have also been accused of denial.

In 2025, Lindsay Shepherd, a director of the Conservative Party of British Columbia, described the Residential School Survivors' flag as "fake", the orange shirt as "a shirt of lies", and stated these symbols "perpetuate untruths about Canadian history, such as the grandest lie of all that 215 children's graves were unearthed in Kamloops".

=== Unmarked graves ===
In 2021, in the wake of the discovery of over 200 anomalies by ground-penetrating radar at the former Kamloops Indian Residential School which were labelled as potential unmarked graves, many critics cite the lack of evidence for true gravesites as supporting their claims that reported death tolls have been inflated. Critics have claimed that mainstream media reported the presence of "mass graves" at residential school sites despite lack of archaeological evidence, in order to mislead the public. This has been described as the "Mass Grave Hoax". This has also resulted in critics going to the ground on which the anomalies were discovered, carrying shovels, attempting to prove that there are no human remains on the site. On National Truth and Reconciliation Day in 2023, then Prime Minister Justin Trudeau stated that denialism was on the rise after disputes regarding the conclusiveness of the evidence of Indian residential schools gravesite discoveries.

The National Post wrote:

The question of mass graves ... remains unresolved ... When anomalies were later investigated at other sites with inconclusive results, skepticism grew—not about the existence of abuse, but about the accuracy of journalism. This is the vacuum into which "denialism" has been projected: a space where open inquiry is mistaken for malice.

Kisha Supernant and Sean Carleton writing for the CBC wrote in response that:

The day before the Kamloops anniversary, the National Post published a column that suggested the public outcry over the past year was mainly the result of some journalists reporting the findings as "mass graves." Communities have been clear that what is being identified are potential unmarked graves, but the column jumped on the error made by some journalists to then suggest that much of the response — both in Canada and around the world — was erroneous and unjustified.

Supernant and Carleton added that "an error made by some journalists does not change the fact that we already know more than 4,000 Indigenous children and youth died in Canada's Indian Residential Schools."

External videos
- "What Remains: Exposing the Kamloops Mass Grave Deceptions" (2025) – IRSRG (108 min)

In 2022, Frances Widdowson has voiced disagreement with the TRC's conclusion that the schools were genocidal, and stated that the residential school system had educational benefits despite its harms. She acknowledges that residential schools hurt people and that children died, but she disagrees with the findings about potential graves at the Kamloops Indian Residential School. In 2025, she co-produced a documentary about residential school gravesites titled What Remains: Exposing the Kamloops Mass Grave Deception's Impact on Powell River.

In 2025, Dallas Brodie made posts on X that read in part: "The number of confirmed child burials at the former Kamloops Indian Residential School site is zero. Zero. No one should be afraid of the truth. Not lawyers, their governing bodies, or anyone else." The Union of British Columbia Indian Chiefs responded with a statement condemning the posts and calling on Brodie to apologize "for promoting abhorrent rhetoric which minimizes the harms of Residential Schools and for misleading and emboldening the public against Indigenous people". On March 7, 2025, Brodie was removed from the Conservative Party of BC caucus as a result of her decision to publicly mock and belittle testimony from former residential school students.

== See also ==
- List of Indian residential schools in Canada
- Media portrayals of the Canadian Indian residential school system
- Missing and Murdered Indigenous Women
- Sixties Scoop
- Abdelmalek, Mariam; Farrugia, Patricia (March 3, 2026). "Denialism: repudiation of anti-Indigenous racism in healthcare in Canada". Frontiers in Public Health. 14 1766047. doi:10.3389/fpubh.2026.1766047. ISSN 2296-2565.
- Bardon, Adrian (October 9, 2019). The Truth About Denial: Bias and Self-Deception in Science, Politics, and Religion. Oxford University Press. doi:10.1093/oso/9780190062262.001.0001. ISBN 978-0-19-006226-2.
- Beauvais, Edana; Williamson, Mark (November 24, 2025). "The Prevalence and Correlates of Residential School Denialism in Canada". Canadian Journal of Political Science: 1–32. doi:10.1017/S0008423925100899. ISSN 0008-4239.
- Beaulieu, Julien O; Montgomery, A Wren; Lyon, Thomas P (November 20, 2025). "Deny or greenwash?: Exploring the interactions between science denialism and greenwashing". Organized Science Denial. Oxford University PressOxford. doi:10.1093/9780198953067.003.0004. ISBN 978-0-19-895303-6.
- Howell, Lisa; Ng-A-Fook, Nicholas (2022). "A Case of Senator Lynn Beyak and Anti-Indigenous Systemic Racism in Canada". Canadian Journal of Education / Revue canadienne de l'éducation. 45 (1). Canadian Society for the Study of Education: 1–34. doi:10.53967/cje-rce.v45i1.4787. ISSN 0380-2361. JSTOR 27169847.
