= Muscowequan Indian Residential School =

Defunct Canadian residential school

- Lestock, Saskatchewan

Information
- Other name: Lestock, Muskowekwan, Touchwood
- Religious affiliation: Roman Catholic
- Established: 1889
- Closed: 1997

The Muscowequan Indian Residential School was a school within the Canadian Indian residential school system that operated on the lands of the Muskowekwan First Nation and in Lestock, Saskatchewan, from 1889 to 1997.

As of 2021, the school building is the last-standing residential school in Saskatchewan. The three-story brick structure was erected in 1931 after the previous building burned down. The school was added to the National Trust for Canada's list of endangered places in 2018. Former students want to see the building restored and used as a museum and archive. In 2018, 331 out of 335 former students voted in favour of keeping the building in place as a reminder of the site's history. The school was designated a national historic site in April 2021.

== History ==
What would become the Muscowequan Indian Residential School began as a Touchwood Hills Mission school started in 1884 by the Qu'Apelle Oblates. The school was enlarged in 1886 to accommodate boarders. In 1888, teacher Fred Dennehy received a grant from the Canadian government to support the boarding of students, at which time the school began operating as a day and boarding school. It fully operated as an Indian Residential School under the Government of Canada from 1889 to June 30, 1997.

The school operated on the Muskowekwan Reservation until 1895, at which time it relocated to a building in Lestock with assistance from the federal government. The government purchased the school's land from the Roman Catholic Church in 1924, with the church continuing operation of the school. The Canadian government took over management of the facility in 1969.

Religious affiliations included the Oblates of Mary Immaculate and later the Oblate Indian and Eskimo Commission (1897-1969), the Grey Nuns (1897-1932) and Oblate Sisters (1932-1977). The Grey Nuns left owing to the need for personnel at a new mission in Saint Vital, Manitoba, necessitating their replacement by the Oblate Sisters. Teaching nuns were replaced by laymen in 1962. The school was eventually converted into a student residence with students attending Muscowequan’s public school or Lebret’s residential school. 1976 saw the Oblates withdraw from school and residence administration. A board of directors made up of members from seven local First Nation Bands began administrative and funding oversight of the school in 1973 and eventually took over school and residence operations in 1981-1982 as the Muskowekwan Education Centre Inc. The Muskowekwan Band were sold surplus IRS land in 1965 and later claimed 28 acres of Crown land on which the IRS was situated, as part of an unfulfilled land entitlement in 1981.

Other names for the school included Touchwood Hills School (1896), Mission School (1910-1963), Muscowequan (Indian) Boarding School (1910-1941), Lestock Indian (Residential) School (1937-1969), Muscowequan Student Residence (1968-1988) and Muskowekwan Education Centre (M.E.C.) (1982-1997).

== Discovery of unmarked graves ==
Document reviews by Indian Residential Schools Resolution Canada found that a cemetery was established behind the student residence apparently with the graves of people of Saulteaux, Cree, Métis as well as European origin. Their deaths were partly credited to an influenza epidemic in the early 1900s. Some graves were moved in 1935 to accommodate the construction of a new residence and the remaining graves were alleged by an Elder who attended the residence to have been "leveled" by a priest in 1944. Later building construction in the mid 1960s to 1970s may have been sited on the unmarked cemetery.

In 1992 during planning for the construction of a new water line by the M.E.C. Board of Directors, a sketch of the unmarked graveyard provided by a board member prompting rerouting of the project. However, remains were still inadvertently uncovered in separate digs. In total, nineteen unmarked graves were discovered with the contractor indicating there was evidence of other graves nearby. Some individuals were reburied where they were found while others were ceremoniously laid to rest in a new cemetery on the Reserve. While a site plan was later found, the boundaries of the cemetery remained poorly defined. Given the chances of disturbing other graves, excavations behind the Student Residence were halted. The re-discovery of the gravesite was one of the examples offered in the Truth and Reconciliation Commission of Canada's final report to underline the importance of documenting and protecting residential school cemeteries, especially "as urban development, infrastructure expansion, and resale or reutilization of old school lands become more common."

Ten to 15 more potential graves were identified between 2018 and 2019 with the assistance of research teams from the University of Alberta and the University of Saskatchewan using ground-penetrating radar. The lead archaeologist noted that "in the (school) records there were 35 children who were unaccounted for, that disappear off the records, and nobody quite knows what happened." Muskowekwan First Nation members later claimed 35 unmarked graves were discovered, with more feared to exist. During a memorial service on June 1, 2021 in honour of residential school attendees and survivors following the identification of 215 potential graves on the grounds of the Kamloops Indian Residential School, Cynthia Desjarlais, a Muskowekwan First Nation councillor, said: "Our elders have told us that there's a lot of areas here that haven't been explored and eventually we will do that".
