= St. Michael's Indian Residential School (Alert Bay) =

St. Michael's Residential School
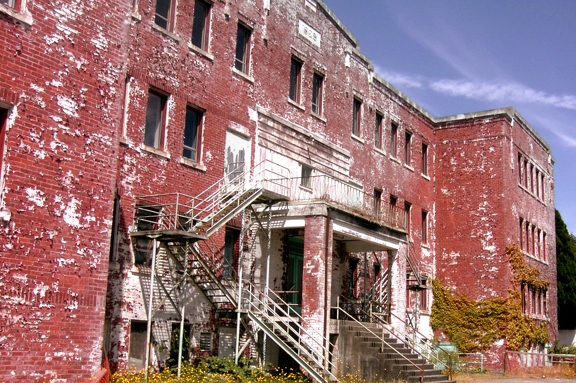
- St. Michael's Residential School in 2003

Location
- Alert Bay, British Columbia; Canada; 50°35′38.4″N 126°56′29.0″W

Information
- Other names: Alert Bay Boys'/Girls' Home; Alert Bay Industrial School; Alert Bay Student Residence; St. Michael's Student Residence
- Type: Canadian Indian Residential School
- Religious affiliation: Anglican Church
- Opened: 1929
- Closed: December 31, 1974; 51 years ago
- Enrollment: 32 (1916); 228 (1959)
- Communities served: Campbell River, Alert Bay, Bella Bella, Bella Coola, Prince Rupert, Haida Gwaii

St. Michael's Indian Residential School was a Canadian residential school in Alert Bay, British Columbia, operated by the Anglican Church for First Nations children.

== History ==
The first residential school in Alert Bay was built in 1882. St. Michael's was constructed in 1929 as a regional facility from Campbell River to Prince Rupert, British Columbia and closed in 1974. It was built at a cost of about $250,000 by the federal Department of Indian Affairs.

With space for 200+ live-in students, it was the largest operated by the Anglican Church at that time. At the school, First Nations students were prohibited from speaking their language and kept away from their families for years.

Indigenous children from Northern Vancouver Island and the province's north coast, including from Bella Bella, Bella Coola, the Nisga’a territories and Haida Gwaii were educated at the four-story red-brick building in the remote community of Alert Bay.

After its closure in 1974, the 'Namgis First Nation was given control of the building and used it for a number of purposes, including housing its own school, a restaurant, a bar and band offices. An attempt to raise $15 million in 2001 to house a language centre was unsuccessful. Carvers began using the space but heating and maintenance costs resulted in the band's closure of the building in 2012.

In the early 21st Century, Canada's Indian Residential Schools Truth and Reconciliation Commission judged claims about physical and sexual abuse in the former school and awarded compensation to complainants.

On February 18, 2015, church leaders, First Nations (including representatives of Assembly of First Nations), politicians and former students attended a healing/cleansing ceremony hosted by the 'Namgis First Nation to mark the demolition of the closed school's building.

== See also ==
- List of Canadian residential schools
