= Trapp Lake =

Coordinates: 50.384°N 120.266°W

Location of Trapp Lake in British Columbia

Trapp Lake is a settlement in British Columbia.
