= Sun Rivers, British Columbia =

Community near Kamloops, British Columbia, Canada

Coordinates: 50.6859°N 120.2949°W

View of Sun Rivers against Mount Peter and Mount Paul

Sun Rivers is a community located on the northeastern side of Kamloops, British Columbia, on the Kamloops Indian Reserve against Mount Peter and Mount Paul. It is located east on Highway 5 near the junction with the Trans Canada Highway. It is developed around the Sun Rivers golf course.
