= Sean Carleton =

Canadian historian

Sean Carleton is Canadian academic and historian who specializes in social movements and political activism in Canada. Carleton holds BA and MA degrees in History from Simon Fraser University and a Ph.D. from the Frost Centre for Canadian Studies and Indigenous Studies from Trent University. He currently teaches in History and Indigenous Studies at the University of Manitoba in Winnipeg, Manitoba, Canada.

== Research ==
Carleton's research focuses on the history of settler capitalism and schooling in Canada, with a particular emphasis on the development of the residential school system. His writing also addresses the rise of residential school denialism and its implications for reconciliation in Canada. He discusses the role of public schools in supporting settler colonialism and offers insights into the history of Indian Day Schools. Other themes of his writing include Indigenous resistance, historical perspectives on colonial strategies, and reflections on significant events in Canadian history.

His publications include the book Lessons in Legitimacy: Colonialism, Capitalism, and the Rise of State Schooling in British Columbia, published in 2022. He has also written about comics and their relation to critical consciousness and colonialism.

In 2026, he edited Truth Before Reconciliation: Confronting Residential School Denialism alongside University of Manitoba colleague Niigaan Sinclair.

Carleton has written review articles that discuss graphic publications and their impact on understanding violence and racism in Canadian history. He has also published various book reviews on works related to Indigenous education and reconciliation.

== Awards ==
- 2024 - Founders' Prize, Best Book (2022-2024), Canadian History of Education Association
- 2023 - Clio Book Prize, BC, Canadian Historical Association
- 2022 - Best Article Prize (2020–2022), Canadian History of Education Association.
- 2020 - 1919: A Graphic History of the Winnipeg General Strike awarded the Canadian Association of Work and Labour Studies Book Prize.
- 2018 - Top 40 Under 40, Avenue magazine, Calgary, Alberta.
- 2017 - Drawn to Change: Graphic Histories of Working-Class Struggle awarded the Wilson Book Prize by the Wilson Institute for Canadian History at McMaster University.
- 2017 - Canadian Historical Association Public History Prize for Graphic History Collective, with Paul Buhle, eds., Drawn to Change: Graphic Histories of Working-Class Struggle.

== See also ==
- List of Canadian historians
