= Kisha Supernant =

Archaeologist and professor

- Born: Kisha Marie Supernant
- Occupations: Archaeologist and Anthropologist

Academic background
- Education: University of Toronto (MA); University of British Columbia (PhD)
- Thesis: Inscribing identities on the landscape : a spatial exploration of archaeological rock features in the Lower Fraser River Canyon (2011)

Academic work
- Discipline: Archaeology; Geographic Information Systems; Indigenous; Landscape; Métis
- Institutions: University of Alberta
- Website: www.kishasupernant.com

Kisha Marie Supernant is an archaeologist, director of the Institute of Prairie and Indigenous Archaeology (IPIA) and professor of the department of Archaeology at the University of Alberta. Noted for her work leading the development of indigenous archaeologies as well as studying the culture and identities and use of space in First Nations communities, particularly the Métis, she is also an expert in geospatial analysis specialising in indigenous cultural heritage.

== Education ==
Supernant was educated at the University of Toronto where she was awarded a Master of Arts degree in Anthropology in 2004. Following this, in 2010 she was awarded a PhD in Philosophy and Archaeology following their research in indigenous cultural heritage from the University of British Columbia.

== Career ==
Supernant's career began in 2008 whereby until 2010, she worked as a researcher supporting the work of Residential Schools Commission at the Indian Residential Schools Commission. From 2009 to 2023, she was an independent archaeological consultant focusing on indigenous and first nation communities such as the Métis.

In 2010, Supernant worked in The University of Alberta as an assistant professor until 2023 teaching both graduate and undergraduate courses in archaeology, Geographic Information Systems (GIS) and theory. In 2019, director of the Institute of Prairie and Indigenous Archaeology (IPIA). In total, she has been with the University of Alberta for over 15 years.

=== Selected publications ===
Supernant's publications include:

- Wadsworth, W.T., S. Halmhofer, and K. Supernant. 2023. Saying What We Mean, Meaning What We Say: Managing Miscommunication in Archaeological Prospection. Archaeological Prospection. 1–16.
- Gupta, N., A. Martindale., K. Supernant, and M. Elvidge. 2023. The CARE Principles and the Reuse, Sharing, and Curation of Indigenous Data in Canadian Archaeology. Advances in Archaeological Practice. 11(1):76–89.
- Montgomery, L. and K. Supernant. 2022. Archaeology in 2021: Repatriation, Reclamation, and Reckoning with Historical Trauma. American Anthropologist. 124:800–812.
- Supernant, K. 2022. Archaeology Sits in Places. Journal of Anthropological Archaeology. 66.
- Wadsworth, W., K. Supernant, Ave Dersch, and the Chipewyan Prairie First Nation. 2021. Integrating Remote Sensing and Indigenous Archaeology to Locate Unmarked Graves: A Case Study from Northern Alberta, Canada. Advances in Archaeological Practice. 9(3):202–214.
- An Integrated Remote Sensing Approach to Métis Archaeology in the Canadian Prairies
- Supernant, K., Baxter, J.E., Lyons, N. and Atalay, S. eds., 2020. Archaeologies of the Heart. New York: Springer
- Kristensen, T., J. Ives, K. Supernant. Power, Security, and Exchange: Impacts of a Late Holocene Volcanic Eruption in Subarctic North America. North American Archaeologist. 42(4):425-472.
- Supernant, K. 2020. Archaeological Pedagogy, Indigenous Histories, and Reconciliation in Canada. Journal of Archaeological Education. 4(3):1–22.
- Hodgetts, L., K. Supernant, N. Lyons, and J.R. Welch. 2020. Broadening #MeToo: Tracking Dynamics in Canadian Archaeology Through a Survey on Experiences Within the Discipline. Canadian Journal of Archaeology. 44(1):20–47
- Surface-Evans, S., A. M. Garrison, and K. Supernant (eds). 2020. Blurring Timescapes, Subverting Erasure: Remembering Ghosts on the Margins of History. Berghahn: New York.
- Archaeologies of the Heart

=== Awards and honours ===
- In 2019, she was named Edmonton's Top 40 under 40 by Avenue Magazine.
- In 2021, she was elected as a member of the Royal Society of Canada College of New Scholars
