= Kamloops Indian Residential School =

Residential school in British Columbia, Canada (1893–1978)

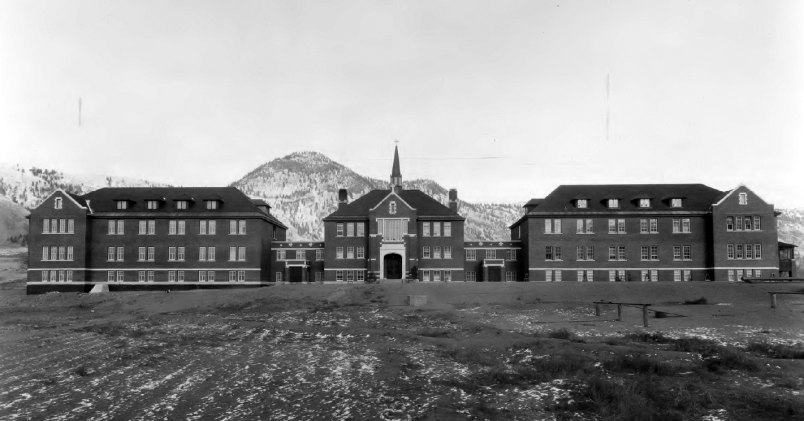
- Kamloops Indian Residential School c. 1930.

Location
- Kamloops, British Columbia; Canada; 50.6796°N 120.2952°W

Information
- Former name: Kamloops Industrial School
- Type: Canadian Indian residential school
- Religious affiliation: Catholic
- Established: 1893
- Closed: 1978
- Authority: Catholic Church in Canada
- Oversight: Department of Indian Affairs and Northern Development
- Principal: Micheal Hagan (1890–1892); A.M. Carion (1893–1916); James Mcguire (?–1927); John Duplanil (1927–?); T. Kennedy (?-1939); James Fergus O'Grady (1939–?); G.P. Dunlop (1958–?)
- Gender: Coed
- Enrolment: 500
- Language: English

The Kamloops Indian Residential School was a residential school part of the Canadian Indian residential school system. Located in Kamloops, British Columbia, it was once the largest residential school in Canada, with its enrolment peaking at 500 in the 1950s. The school was established in 1890 and operated until 1969, when it was taken over from the Catholic Church by the federal government to be used as a day school residence. It closed in 1978. (Note: The year the school closed is inconsistently reported with some indicating 1977 and other indicating 1978 as the final year of operation. The National Student Memorial, a list of dead children maintained by the National Centre for Truth and Reconciliation, lists the year the school closed as 1978.) The extant school building is located on the Tk’emlúps te Secwépemc First Nation.

In 2021, Sarah Beaulieu, an anthropologist at the University of the Fraser Valley, surveyed the apple orchard on the grounds with ground-penetrating radar (GPR) and concluded it probably had some 200 unmarked graves, but noted that "only forensic investigation with excavation" could confirm the presence of human remains. As of May 2022, decision-making was in progress on whether to investigate the site or to leave it undisturbed. In 2024 the Tk’emlups te Secwepemc band announced that their investigation was proceeding but would remain confidential to preserve its integrity. On May 30, 2026, The Globe and Mail reported that in the five years of investigation at the school no human remains were ever found. That includes the 215 remains originally claimed by the Tk’emlups te Secwepemc band, which prompted The Globe and Mail to apologize for publishing the claim without first verifying it.

== History ==
What would become the Kamloops Indian Residential School was established in 1893, after initially opening on May 19, 1890, as the Kamloops Industrial School. Built near the city of Kamloops, British Columbia, it is located on the traditional territory of the Secwepemc (Secwépemcúl'ecw). The school was established as part of government policy of forced assimilation of Indigenous children. J.D. Ross of Kamloops was awarded the $10,000 contract to erect the initial set of industrial school buildings in April 1889. The first three two-story wooden structures had separate living quarters for boys and girls and teachers, along with classrooms and a recreation area.

After first principal Michel Hagan resigned in 1892, the government put the Oblates of Mary Immaculate in charge of the school. Father Alphonse-Marie Carion was named principal of the school in March 1893. In his 1896 annual report to the Department of Indian Affairs, Carion emphasized that the moral and religious training of students at the school was "the most important of all" and that school officials kept "constantly before their mind the object which the Government has in view in carrying on the industrial-schools, which is to civilize the Indians, to make them good, useful and lawabiding members of society." He remained principal of the school until 1916.

In 1927, John Duplanil succeeded James Mcguire (Note: Surname erroneously spelled in publication as 'Maguire'. Volume 1 of the Final Report of the Truth and Reconciliation Commission of Canada uses Mcguire as spelling and identifies first name as James. The same surname spelling appears in the 1927 Annual Report of the Department of Indian Affairs.) as principal of the school, following Maguire's (McGuire's) appointment as curate of St. Patrick's Church in Lethbridge, Alberta. James Fergus O'Grady was named principal in 1939, following the departure of T. Kennedy. G. P. Dunlop took over as head of the school in 1958, relocating from a position at the Eugene Mission Indian School in Cranbrook, British Columbia.

The school was taken over by the federal government in 1969. During this time it operated as a residence for students attending other area schools until it permanently closed in 1978.

The school was featured in the 1962 Christmas-themed film Eyes of the Children. Produced by George Robertson, the film followed 400 students as they prepared for Christmas and aired on the CBC on Christmas Day. Gerald Mathieu Moran worked there while the documentary was filmed. A boy's supervisor, he was charged in the 1990s with several dozen sex crimes committed at the Kamloops Indian Residential School. He pled guilty and spent three years in jail. A former student told a TRC hearing that another instructor would come into the girls' dorm at night with a flashlight and choose a girl to assault.

In the 1988 book Resistance and renewal: surviving the Indian residential school, Celia Haig-Brown argued that the school system had failed due to the resistance of the Shuswap (Secwepemc) people, since they still existed as a nation:

"Although its effects have been devastating for individuals, the Kamloops Indian Residential School was not successful in its attempts to assimilate the Native people of the Central Interior of the province."

In 1991, a special edition of Secwepemc News offered a different perspective, reporting that the public policy which led to the 80-year operation of the school had "done its job; English is now the predominant language within the Shuswap Nation and the survival of the Shuswap language is uncertain."

In 1982, the building opened for use as the first location of the Secwepemc Museum.

=== School attendance and conditions ===
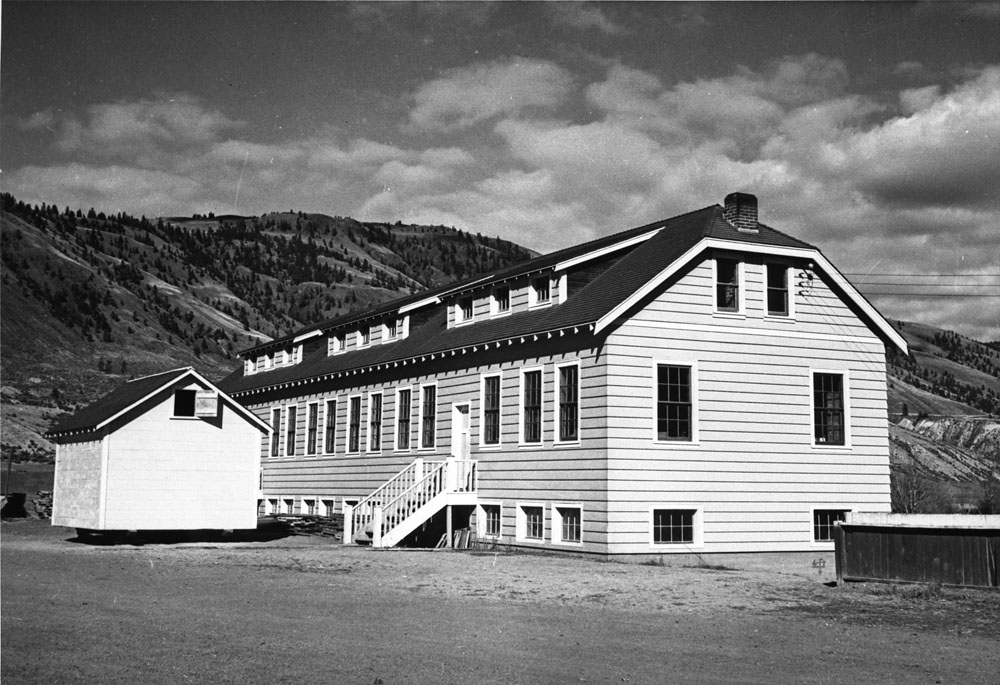
New classroom building of Kamloops Indian Residential School circa 1950

Hundreds of children attended the school, many forcibly removed from their homes following the introduction of mandatory attendance laws in the 1920s. The children who attended were not allowed to speak their native languages and were whipped for using them. In addition to Secwépemc children, students from communities across British Columbia attended the school, including Penticton, Hope, Mount Currie, and Lillooet, along with students from other provinces. (Note: The Indian Residential School History & Dialogue Centre's entry for the Kamloops school includes a more extensive list of students' home communities.)

At one point, this was the largest Canadian residential school. Canadian politician Leonard Marchand (Okanagan Indian Band) attended the school. So did George Manuel (Secwépemc Nation), who said his three strongest memories of the school were: "hunger; speaking English; and being called a heathen because of my grandfather." In 1910, the principal said that the government did not provide enough money to properly feed the students.

On December 24, 1924, the girls' wing of the school was destroyed by a fire, forcing 40 students into −10 °C (14 °F) weather in only their night clothes. Three years later, in 1927, a report outlining the conditions at the school concluded that the poor construction of buildings at the school led to "numerous infections, colds, bronchitis, and pneumonia" during the previous winter. During the 1957–1958 influenza pandemic, the Kamloops district health officer, D. M. Black, reported that half of the students at the school had been ill. At the time, health officials from the University of British Columbia acknowledged the infection rate was "slightly more than normal but not a serious worry."

In 2015, the Truth and Reconciliation Commission of Canada determined that the residential schools were a system of "cultural genocide". It concluded that at least 4,100 students died while attending the schools, many of them due to abuse, negligence, disease, and accidents. The report concluded that it would be impossible to estimate the total number of deaths that occurred at the schools.

Students at the school received harsh treatment, including being hit with a shillelagh or being shamed for minor mistakes.

=== Mandatory European folk dancing ===
The school operated a girls' folk dancing program beginning in the 1940s that focused only on European dance styles. Sister Mary Leonita initially taught Irish dancing, and later, other European folk styles including Swiss and Ukrainian dancing. Children in the program were prohibited from learning indigenous dances.

Dancers from the program were featured at the 1960 Pacific National Exhibition. In July 1964, girls from the school went to Mexico and performed in a series of festivals. Canadian embassy officials called them the "finest ambassadors ever to come from Canada". The Knights of Columbus raised the funds for the trip. The same year, group leader Sister Mary Leonita transferred away from the school, and the dance program ended.

== Possible unmarked graves ==
In 2021, Dr. Sarah Beaulieu, an anthropologist with "about a decade of experience searching for historical grave sites", surveyed the area with ground-penetrating radar (GPR) and observed "disruptions in the ground" which could be 200 unmarked graves, based on "their placement, size, depth, and other features". The indigenous community had long suspected that unmarked graves were located at the residential school, attested to by oral history and eyewitness' memories. Individuals who had once been forced to attend the Kamloops Indian Residential School as children have described recollections of hearing of children being forced to dig holes (which some referred to as graves) at the site of the apple orchard. Additionally, some former students have reported seeing what they believed appeared to be children's or infant's bodies in various locations within the school and its grounds. These recollections led to the apple orchard site being chosen as the location to undergo GPR analysis.

Kúkpi7 Rosanne Casimir of the Tkʼemlúps te Secwépemc (TteS) said that work was underway to determine whether the Royal British Columbia Museum held relevant records.

Preliminary findings announced in May 2021 by the Tk’emlúps te Secwépemc suggested that 215 graves could exist at the site. The National Centre for Truth and Reconciliation had officially documented 51 students who died at the school. Their dates of death range from 1919 until 1971. In July 2021, Beaulieu revised her estimate to 200 and noted that they should be considered "probable burials" or "targets of interest", and said that only with an excavation could they be confirmed as human remains. Beaulieu also noted that the apple orchard she surveyed constituted only two acres of the 160-acre residential school site.

Terry Teegee, the Regional Chief of the British Columbia Assembly of First Nations, said he believed that human remains were at the site. In May 2021 he said that plans were being made for forensic experts to exhume, identify and repatriate the potential remains of children from the school.

In May 2024, on the third anniversary of Beaulieu's survey, Tkʼemlúps te Secwépemc issued a statement that referred to the 215 suspected burial sites as "anomalies" rather than "children", which word had been used in its 2021 statement.

=== Investigation ===
In May 2022, Casimir said that a technical taskforce had been formed "of various professors as well as technical archeologists" and that work on an archeological dig and possible exhumations could soon begin. CBC reported that the proposed idea remained controversial among school survivors, "with some seeing exhumation as a process that could help lay victims properly to rest, while others want them left undisturbed." The RCMP "E" Division stated at the time that while it had opened an investigation "so that we can assist should our assistance be required", it was "respect[ing] that Tk'emlúps te Secwépemc remains as the lead official at this time", and was not looking into the site itself.

As of March 2024, the Tk’emlúps te Secwépemc said that a decision to excavate the unmarked graves is "unresolved".

As of February 2025, no human remains have been excavated or confirmed at the former Kamloops Indian Residential School site. The anomalies detected in 2021 remain unverified.

=== Reactions ===
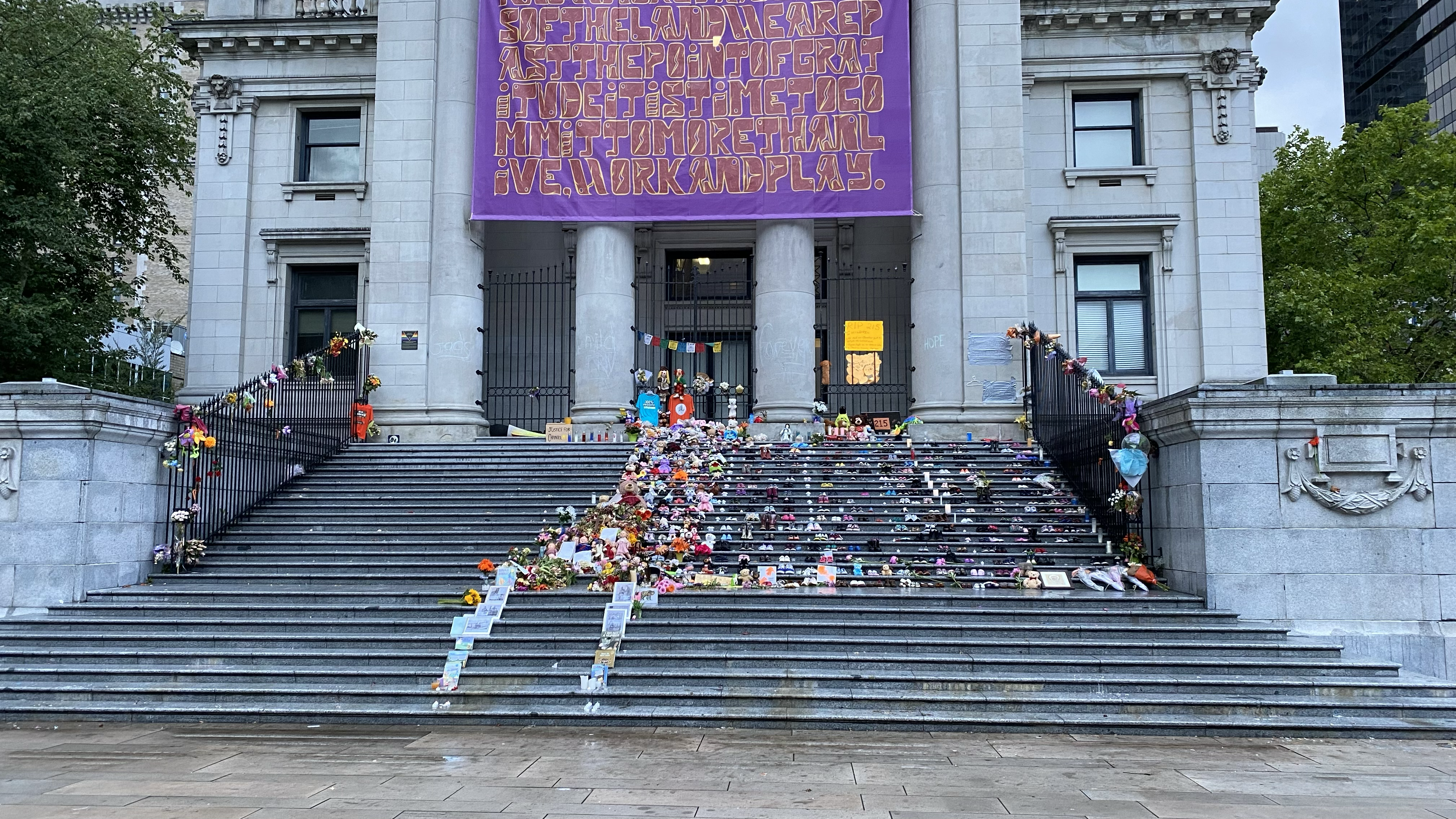
A community memorial at the Vancouver Art Gallery, 6 June 2021

Chief Rosanne Casimir called the finding "an unthinkable loss ... never documented by the school's administrators".

Numerous political leaders expressed opinions about the potential findings. Richard Jock, CEO of First Nations Health Authority, expressed sadness in a released statement.

"That this situation exists is sadly not a surprise and illustrates the damaging and lasting impacts that the residential school system continues to have on First Nations people, their families and communities."

Premier of British Columbia John Horgan said that he was "horrified and heartbroken" at the discovery, and that he supported further efforts to bring to "light the full extent of this loss". Federal Minister of Indigenous Services Marc Miller also offered his support. Prime Minister Justin Trudeau called the discovery "heartbreaking" the day of the announcement, and, on May 30, advised the Governor General to order flags on federal buildings to be flown at half-mast until further notice. Some institutions flew the Canadian flag at half-mast for 215 hours, to mark one hour for each suspected missing child. Other half-mastings included flags at the BC and Manitoba legislatures as well as individual municipalities such as Ottawa, Montreal, Edmonton, Mississauga, Brampton, and Toronto, which also ordered the 3D Toronto sign dimmed for 215 hours.

In a statement released May 31, 2021, the Office of the Chief of Tk’emlúps te Secwépemc acknowledged the gestures made by the government and federal parties, but insisted the government face accountability to all communities subjected to the enduring effects of the federally-mandated Indian Residential School system.

Angela White, executive director for the Indian Residential School Survivors Society, also called on the Canadian federal government and Catholic Church to take action and responsibility towards reconciliation efforts, stating "Reconciliation does not mean anything if there is no action to those words ... [w]ell-wishes and prayers only go so far. If we are going to actually create positive strides forward there needs to be that ability to continue the work, like the Indian Residential School Survivors Society does, in a meaningful way."

The discovery inspired a community memorial at the Vancouver Art Gallery, at which 215 pairs of children's shoes were laid out in rows. Similar memorials were created across Canada, including in front of government buildings and buildings of churches that had been in charge of running the residential school system. At the Ontario Legislative Building, security initially ordered the shoes removed before acquiescing. The Anishinabek Nation tweeted in support of social media calls to put out teddy bears on porches on May 31, similar to what was done after the 2018 Humboldt Broncos bus crash with hockey sticks. Another popular campaign called on people to wear orange on May 31.

Within days of the report, the University of British Columbia announced a review of an honorary degree it had granted in 1986 to Bishop James Fergus O'Grady, a former principal of Kamloops Indian Residential School. He had written a letter to parents in 1948 about the "privilege" of Christmas break, stating that any travel costs associated with students going home would have to be covered by their families and that any children who failed to return to school by January 3 would be prohibited from Christmas break the following year. In the 2007 documentary The Fallen Feather, Ernie Philip shared his experience of corporal punishment as a student at the school, stating that he "got 50 lashes on my back" from O'Grady after Philip was caught running away from the school.

On June 2, 2021, Archbishop of Vancouver J. Michael Miller said that the Catholic Church would help to identify the deceased children.

On June 4, 2021, nine United Nations human rights experts called on Canada and the Catholic Church to carry out thorough investigations, and "conduct full-fledged investigations into the circumstances and responsibilities surrounding these deaths, including forensic examinations of the remains found, and to proceed to the identification and registration of the missing children." On June 6, 2021, speaking to people gathered in St. Peter's Square, Pope Francis commented on the discovery:

"This sad discovery increases the awareness of the sorrows and sufferings of the past ... May the political and religious authorities continue to collaborate with determination to shed light on this sad affair and to commit to a path of healing."

In response to the initial announcement, the Government of Ontario pledged $10 million to fund a search for unmarked graves at Ontario residential schools. Many Canada Day festivities were either cancelled or modified to promote reconciliation, out of respect for the discovery. On June 10, the city of Victoria, British Columbia announced the cancellation of its Canada Day festivities – already a virtual event due to COVID-19 restrictions. An alternative broadcast would be produced in collaboration with the local First Nations to "[explore] what it means to be Canadian, in light of recent events." Similar decisions to cancel municipality-led Canada Day festivities were made by Prince Edward County, Ontario, Air Ronge, La Ronge, and Lac La Ronge Indian Band. According to a poll released on June 17, 2021, by the Innovative Research Group, 77% of Canadian respondents said they were "very familiar" or "somewhat familiar" with the reports of possible human remains of Kamloops Indian Residential School.

On June 22, 2021, the Chinese government demanded an investigation into the human rights violations against the Indigenous people in Canada at the UN Human Rights Council, which was supported by Belarus, Iran, North Korea, Syria, Russia, and Venezuela. Canadian Prime Minister Justin Trudeau responded that, "In Canada, we had a Truth and Reconciliation Commission. Where's China's Truth and Reconciliation Commission? China is not recognizing there is even a problem. That is a pretty fundamental difference."

Journalist Terry Glavin of the National Post and American political scientist Wilfred Reilly, writing in British internet-based magazine Spiked, have stated skepticism about the claims, due to the lack of exhumations.

In August 2025, an Angus Reid public opinion poll found that 63% of Canadians and 56% of Indigenous people think that further evidence through exhumation is necessary to accept that the remains of children are buried at the site.

== See also ==
- List of Indian residential schools in Canada
- Canadian Indian residential school gravesites
- Marieval Indian Residential School, another Residential School in Canada, operational from 1898 to 1997, where 751 unmarked graves were found in June 2021.
- Bon Secours Mother and Baby Home, maternity home in Ireland, open from 1925 to 1961, where 800 children were found in unmarked graves
- Florida School for Boys, reform school, operational from 1900 to 2011, where the remains of dozens of children were found in unmarked graves
- Jersey child abuse investigation, 2007-2008 police investigation based on hundreds of allegations which brought to light decades of widespread child abuse at the former children's home Haut de la Garenne, as well as at other institutions for children, on the British island of Jersey
- Medomsley Detention Centre, a prison for young males in England (closed in the late 1980s) where more than 1,800 living former inmates reported sexual and physical abuse by staff.
