= List of Indian residential schools in Canada =

Abbreviation	Religious denomination
(AN)	Anglican Church
(BP)	Baptist
(MD)	Methodist
(OO)	Other
(PB)	Presbyterian Church
(RC)	Roman Catholic Church
(UC)	United Church of Canada

The following is a list of schools that operated as part of the Canadian Indian residential school system. (Note: Indian has been used because of the historical nature of the article and the precision of the name. It was, and continues to be, used by government officials, Indigenous peoples and historians while referencing the school system. The use of the name also provides relevant context about the era in which the system was established, specifically one in which Indigenous peoples in Canada were homogeneously referred to as Indians rather than by language that distinguishes First Nations, Inuit and Métis peoples. Use of Indian is limited throughout the article to proper nouns and references to government legislation.) The first opened in 1828, and the last closed in 1997. These schools operated in all Canadian provinces and territories except Prince Edward Island, and New Brunswick.

The Indian Residential School Settlement Agreement (IRSSA) has formally recognized 139 residential schools across Canada, but this number excludes schools that operated without federal support.

The last school to close was Kivalliq Hall in Rankin Inlet, in what is now Nunavut, which closed in 1997; it became a IRSSA-recognized school in 2019 following a court ruling, which is why earlier accounts describe the last school closing in 1996.

Schools in Newfoundland and Labrador were not included in the original settlement by the Harper government and instead reached a compensation deal with the federal government after a lawsuit in 2016.

== List ==
Name	Location	Province/territory	Opened	Closed	Denomination	Documented deaths	Gravesites
Assumption (Hay Lake) Indian Residential School	Assumption (Hay Lake)	AB	1951	1970	RC	2	
Shubenacadie Indian Residential School	Shubenacadie	NS	1929	1967	RC	23	
Blue Quill (Lac la Biche/Saddle Lake/Sacred Heart) Indian Residential School (Hospice of St. Joseph; Lac la Biche/St. Paul's Boarding School)	Lac la Biche (1862-1898) Saddle Lake (1898-1931) (Saddle Lake) St. Paul (1898-1931)	AB	1862	1970 (became the first Native-administered school in Canada)	RC	43	Accidentally exhumed multiple graves in 2004; intentionally exhumed 1 grave in 2024
Holy Angels Indian Residential School (École des Saints-Anges / Our Lady of Victoria Indian Residential School)	Fort Chipewyan	AB	1902	1974	RC	83	
Crowfoot (St. Joseph's) Indian Residential School (Blackfoot Residential School)	Blackfoot Crossing (1900-1909) Cluny (Siksika 146)	AB	1900	1968	RC	48	
St. Joseph's (Dunbow) Industrial School (High River Industrial School)	High River	AB	1884	1922	RC	59	Flood exposed 34 graves in 1996
Edmonton (Poundmaker) Residential School	St. Albert (Poundmaker)	AB	1924 (formerly Red Deer Industrial School)	1968	MD	33	
Ermineskin Indian Residential School	Hobbema (Ermineskin)	AB	1915	1973	RC	15	
St. Mary’s (Blood) Indian Residential School (Immaculate Conception Boarding School)	Stand-Off (Blood)	AB	1898	1988	RC	49	
Morley (Stoney) Residential School (McDougall Orphanage and Training Institution)	Morley (Stoney)	AB	1926	1949	MD	16	
Old Sun (Blackfoot) Residential School (North Camp Residential School / White Eagle's Boarding School / Short Robe Boarding School)	Gleichen (Blackfoot)	AB	1894	1971	AN	41	
Sacred Heart (Peigan) Residential School	Brocket (Peigan)	AB	1892	1961	RC	41	
Red Deer Industrial School	Red Deer	AB	1893	1919 (Poundmaker school opened 5 years later)	MD	60	
Sarcee (St. Barnabas) Residential School	Sarcee Junction, Calgary (Sarcee/T’suu Tina)	AB	1892	1921	AN	35	
St. Albert (Youville) Residential School	St. Albert	AB	1873	1948	RC	73	
Whitefish Lake (St. Andrew's) Residential School	Whitefish Lake (Whitefish Lake)	AB	1895	1950	AN	4	
Grouard (St. Bernard’s) Residential School	Grouard	AB	1894	1957	RC	15	Radar detected 196 potential graves in 2022
Joussard (St. Bruno's) Residential School	Joussard	AB	1913	1969	RC	30	Radar detected 88 potential graves in 2022
St. Cyprian's (Queen Victoria’s Jubilee Home) Residential School (Victoria Jubilee Home for Indian Children)	Brocket (Peigan)	AB	1900 (new school built in 1926)	1962	AN	25	
Sturgeon Lake (Calais) Residential School (St. François/Francis Xavier Boarding school)	Calais	AB	1907	1961	RC	45	
Fort Vermilion (St. Henri) Residential School	Fort Vermilion	AB	1903	1968	RC	21	
Wabasca (St. John’s) Residential School	Wabasca	AB	1902 (new school built in 1949)	1966	AN	11	
Desmarais (St. Martin’s) Residential School	Desmarais-Wabasca	AB	1901	1973	RC	16	
St. Paul's (Blood) Residential School (Church of England)	Cardston (Blood)	AB	1893	1975	AN	78	
Lesser Slave Lake (St. Peter's) Residential School	Slave Lake	AB	1895	1932	AN	2	
Alberni Indian Residential School	Port Alberni	BC	1900 (burned in 1917, rebuilt in 1920; burned in 1937, rebuilt in 1939)	1973	UC	40	Radar detected 17 potential graves in 2023
Ahousaht Indian Residential School	Ahousaht	BC	1901	1950	PB	8	
Anahim Lake Dormitory (Ulkatcho) Residential School	Anahim Lake (Ulkatcho)	BC	1968	1977	RC	0	
Christie (Clayoquot/Kakawis) Residential School	Meares Island (1900-1971) Tofino (1971-1983)	BC	1900	1983	RC	46	
Kamloops (St. Louis) Residential School (Kamloops Industrial School)	Kamloops (Tk’emlúps te Secwépemc)	BC	1890	1978	RC	82	Radar detected 200 potential graves in 2021
Kitimaat Indian Residential School (Elizabeth Long Memorial School for Girls)	Kitimaat	BC	1908	1941	MD	12	
Kootenay (St. Eugene's/St. Mary's Residential School)	Cranbrook	BC	1867	1984	RC	29	Accidentally exhumed 1 grave in 2020; Radar detected 182 potential graves in 2021
Kuper Island Indian Residential School	Penelakut Island	BC	1890	1975	RC	171	Radar detected 160 potential graves in 2021
Lejac (Stuart Lake) Residential School	Fraser Lake	BC	1917 (new building in 1922)	1976	RC	45	
Lower Post Indian Residential School	Lower Post	BC	1951	1975	RC	3	
Coqualeetza (Chilliwack Home) Residential School	Chilliwack	BC	1889	1940 (later became the Coqualeetza Hospital and is now the Coqualeetza Cultural Education Centre)	MD	42	
Metlakatla Indian Residential School (Metlakatla Indian Girls' School)	Metlakatla	BC	1891	1962	OO		
Port Simpson Residential School (Crosby Home for Girls)	Port Simpson	BC	1892	1948	MD	3	
Presbyterian Coqualeetza Indian Residential School	Chilliwack	BC	1861	1940	PB		
Roman Catholic Coqualeetza Indian Residential School	Chilliwack	BC	1890	1941	RC		
St. Augustine's Indian Residential School	Sechelt	BC	1912	1975	RC	12	Radar detected 40 potential graves in 2023
St. Paul’s Indian Residential School	North Vancouver	BC	1898	1959	RC	4	
St. George's (Lytton) Indian Residential School	Lytton	BC	1901 (new school built in 1928)	1979	AN	78	
St. Mary's Mission Indian Residential School	Mission (Pekw'Xe:yles)	BC	1861	1984	RC	18	
St. Michael's (Alert Bay) Indian Residential School	Alert Bay	BC	1929	1975	AN	18	
Williams Lake Indian Residential School (Williams Lake Industrial School)	Cariboo	BC	1890	1981	RC	28	Radar detected 93 potential graves in 2022
Yale Indian Residential School	Yale	BC	1900	1920	AN	5	
Yuquot Indian Residential School	Yuquot	BC	1901	1913	RC		
Assiniboia Indian Residential School (Assiniboia Hostel)	Winnipeg	MB	1958 (September 2)	1973 (June 30)	RC	1	
Birtle Indian Residential School	Birtle	MB	1888 (December 3)	1970	PB	47	
Brandon Indian Residential School (Brandon Industrial School)	Brandon	MB	1895 (May 23)	1972 (June 30)	MD	94	Radar detected 104 potential graves in 2019
Cross Lake Indian Residential School (Norway House Roman Catholic Indian Residential School)	Cross Lake	MB	1915 (March 9)	1969 (July 30)	RC	57	
Elkhorn Indian Residential School (Elkhorn Industrial School / Washakada Indian Residential School)	Elkhorn	MB	1888	1919 (as CP Railway purchased land on which school was built)	AN	76	
Elkhorn Indian Residential School (Washakada Indian Residential School)	Elkhorn	MB	1925	1949	AN	10	
Fort Alexander Indian Residential School	Pine Falls	MB	1905	1970 (June)	RC	35	Radar detected 190 anomalies in 2022
Guy Hill Indian Residential School	The Pas and Clearwater Lake	MB	1952 (Students were relocated from Sturgeon Landing, Saskatchewan to a temporary school in The Pas until a newly built school in Clearwater Lake in 1958)	1979 (June 30)	RC	2	Radar detected 71 potential graves in 2022; excavation of 14 found no evidence of human remains
Lake St. Martin Indian Residential School	Fisher River	MB	1874 (new school built in 1948)	1963	AN		Cadaver dogs detected multiple potential graves in 2024
MacKay Indian Residential School	The Pas	MB	1915	1933	AN	10	
MacKay Indian Residential School	Dauphin	MB	1955	1989	AN	1	
Norway House Methodist Indian Residential School	Norway House	MB	1900	1967 (June 30)	MD	23	
Pine Creek Indian Residential School (Camperville Indian Residential School)	Camperville	MB	1890	1969 (August 31)	RC	50	
Portage la Prairie Methodist Indian Residential School	Portage la Prairie	MB	1891	1975 (June 30)	MD		
Portage la Prairie Presbyterian Indian Residential	Portage la Prairie	MB	1895	1950	PB	5	
Sandy Bay Indian Residential School	Sandy Bay Reserve	MB	1905	1970 (June 30)	RC	22	Radar detected 13 potential graves in 2022
St. Boniface Industrial School	St. Boniface	MB	1891	1909	RC	87	
St. Paul's Industrial School (St. Rupert's Land Industrial School)	Selkirk	MB	1886	1906	AN		
Waterhen Indian Residential School	Waterhen	MB	1890	1900	RC		
Lockwood School*	Cartwright	NL		1964	OO		
Makkovik Boarding School*	Makkovik	NL		1960	OO		
Nain Boarding School*	Nain	NL		1973	OO		
St. Anthony's Orphanage*	St. Anthony	NL		1979	OO		
Yale School*	North West River	NL		1980	OO		
Aklavik Anglican Indian Residential School (All Saints Indian Residential School)	Shingle Point	NWT	1927 (moved to Aklavik in 1934 due to overcrowding	1959	AN	59	
Aklavik Catholic Indian Residential School (later Inuvik Indian Residential School)	Aklavik	NWT	1925 (relocated to Inuvik in 1959; Stringer Hall was Anglican Residence and Grollier Hall the RC residence)	1996 (June 1975 (Stringer Hall); June 30 1996 (Grollier Hall))	RC	20	
Fort McPherson Indian Residential School; (Including residence, Fleming Hall);	Fort McPherson	NWT	1898	1970	OO (non-denominational)	1	
Fort Providence Indian Residential School (Providence Mission Indian Residential School)	Fort Providence	NWT	1867	1953	RC	88	Radar detected 150 to 298 potential graves in 2021
Fort Resolution Indian Residential School	Fort Resolution	NWT	1867	1957	RC	67	Intentionally exhumed 7 graves in 2025
Fort Simpson Indian Residential School (Fort Simpson Boarding School, including residences Bompas Hall, Lapointe Hall, St. Margaret's Hall)	Fort Simpson	NWT	1920	1970	RC	3	
Fort Smith Indian Residential School (Breynat Hall)	Fort Smith	NWT	1957	1970	RC	1	
Hay River Indian Residential School (St. Peter's Mission Indian Residential School)	Hay River	NWT	1898	1949	AN	42	
Akaitcho Hall (dormitory for Sir John Franklin High School)	Yellowknife	NWT	1958	1994	Federal/GNWT	4	
Shubenacadie Indian Residential School	Shubenacadie	NS	1922	1968	RC	23	
Chesterfield Inlet Indian Residential School (including residence: Turquetil)	Chesterfield Inlet	NU	1929	1970	RC	3	
Frobisher Bay Indian Residential School	Frobisher Bay	NU	1965	1992 The building now houses the Nunatta Residence of the Nunavut Arctic College.(students were transferred to a new hostel, which operated until 1996.)	RC	2	
Kivalliq Hall	Rankin Inlet	NU	1985	1997	OO	0	
Albany Mission Indian Residential School (Fort Albany Residential School)	Fort Albany	ON	1912	1963	RC	32	
Alexandra Industrial School for Girls	Toronto	ON	1897	1910	OO		
Alnwick Industrial School (in partnership with Mount Elgin Indian Residential School)	Alderville	ON	1838	1966	MD		
Bishop Horden Memorial School (Moose Factory Indian Residential School; Moose Fort Indian Residential School)	Moose Factory	ON	1907	1963	AN	57	
Cecilia Jeffrey Indian Residential School (Shoal Lake)	Kenora	ON	1900	1966	PB	50	
Chapleau Indian Residential School (Saint John's Indian Residential School)	Chapleau	ON	1907	1950	AN	56	
Fort Frances Indian Residential School (St. Margaret's Indian Residential School)	Fort Frances	ON	1902	1974	RC	3	
McIntosh Indian Residential School (Kenora Indian Residential School)	Kenora	ON	1925	1969	RC	45	Radar detected 114 potential graves in 2025
Mohawk Institute Residential School (Mohawk Manual Labour School; Mush Hole Indian Residential School)	Brantford	ON	1828	1970	AN	47	Accidentally exhumed 1 grave in 2020; radar search in progress
Mount Elgin Indian Residential School (in partnership with Alnwick)	Muncey Town	ON	1848	1948	MD	16	
Shingwauk Indian Residential School	Garden River	ON	1873	1873 (burned down six days after opening)	AN	0	
Shingwauk Indian Residential School	Sault Ste. Marie	ON	1873 (merged with Wawanosh to form a larger school in 1900)	1971 (currently houses Algoma University)	AN	87	
Wawanosh School for Girls	Sault Ste Marie	ON	1877	1900 (merged with Shingwauk)	AN	0	
Sioux Lookout Indian Residential School (Pelican Lake Day School)	Sioux Lookout	ON	1911	1973	AN	11	
Spanish Indian Residential Schools; St. Joseph Residential School 1916–1962 (girls school) still standing; St Charles Garnier College 1913–1958 (boys school)now demolished	Spanish	ON	1883	1965	RC	114	
St. Anne’s Indian Residential School	Fort Albany	ON	1936	1964	RC	32	
St. Joseph's Orphanage and Boarding School (for Indigenous and White Children)	Fort William	ON	1870	1968	RC	10	
St. Mary's Indian Residential School	Kenora	ON	1894	1962	RC	46	Radar detected 171 and cadaver dogs detected 22 potential graves in 2023
Wikwemikong Indian Residential School (Wikwemikong Day School)	Manitowaning	ON	1840 (day school); 1879 (residential school)	1963	RC		
Armstrong Indian Residential School (Armstrong Residential School; Armstrong Home and School)	Armstrong	ON	1880	1891	RC		
Amos Indian Residential School (St. Marc's Indian Residential School)	St. Marc-de-Figuery	QC	1955	1973	RC	0	
Federal Hostel at George River	Kangirsualujjuaq	QC	1960	1960	OO (Non-Denominational)	0	
Federal Hostel at Great Whale River	Kuujjuarapik (Poste-de-la-Baleine)	QC	1960	1970	OO (Non-Denominational)	0	
Federal Hostel at Payne Bay	Kangirsuk (Bellin)	QC	1960	1960	OO (Non-Denominational)	0	
Federal Hostel at Port Harrison	Inukjuak	QC	1960	1971	OO (Non-Denominational)	0	
Fort George Hostels	Chisasibi (Cree village municipality)	QC	1975	1978	OO (Non-Denominational)	0	
St. Philip's Indian Residential School	Chisasibi (Cree village municipality)	QC	1932 (burned in 1943, rebuilt in 1944)	1975	AN	28	
Fort George (St. Joseph's Mission, Residence Couture, Sainte-Thérèse-de-l'Énfant-Jésus)	Chisasibi (Cree village municipality)	QC	1936	1952	RC	21	
La Tuque Indian Residential School	La Tuque	QC	1963	1978	AN	2	
Pointe Bleue Indian Residential School	Mashteuiatsh	QC	1956	1965	RC	1	
Sept-Iles Indian Residential School (Seven Islands, Notre Dame, Maliotenam)	Sept-Îles	QC	1952	1967	RC	1	
Battleford Industrial School	Battleford	SK	1883	1914	AN	64	Intentionally exhumed 72 graves in 1974
Beauval Indian Residential School	Beauval	SK	1895	1983 (became Meadow Lake Tribal Council's Beauval Indian Education Centre which closed in 1995)	RC	60	
Cowesses Indian Residential School (Marieval Indian Residential School)	Marieval	SK	1899	1981 (First Nation Operated 1981-1997)	RC	18	Radar detected 751 potential graves in 2021
Crowstand Indian Residential School	Kamsack	SK	1888	1916	PB	34	
St. Michael's Indian Residential School (Duck Lake Indian Residential School)	Duck Lake	SK	1894	1982, turned over to the Saskatoon District Tribal Council. Closed in 1996.	RC	108	
Emmanuel College	Prince Albert	SK	1879	1923	AN	18	
File Hills Indian Residential School (File Hills Colony School)	Okanese Reserve	SK	1889	1949	PB	15	
Gordon Indian Residential School	Punnichy	SK	1889 (new school built in 1911, burned down in 1929)	1996	AN	43	Radar detected 14 potential graves in 2022
Guy Hill Indian Residential School	Sturgeon Landing	SK	1926	1952 (burned down September 4, 1952; students were relocated to temporary school in The Pas until a newly built school opened in Clearwater Lake in 1958)	RC	2	
Île-à-la-Crosse Indian Residential School	Île-à-la-Crosse	SK	1878	1976 (the boarding school section)	RC		
Lac La Ronge (All Saints) Mission Indian Residential School	La Ronge	SK	1914 (new school built in 1920)	1947 (amalgamated with St. Albans to become Prince Albert Indian Residential School after fire)	AN	11	Radar detected multiple potential graves in 2021
Muscowequan Indian Residential School	Lestock	SK	1932	1981	RC	35	Accidentally exhumed 19 graves in 1992; Radar detected 15 potential graves in 2018
St. Albans Indian Residential School	Prince Albert	SK	1894	1951 (amalgamated with All Saints to become Prince Albert Indian Residential School)	AN	18	
Prince Albert Indian Residential School	Prince Albert	SK	1951 (merger of All Saints and St. Albans)	1964	AN	0	
Qu'Appelle Indian Residential School (Qu'Appelle Industrial School); Lebret Indian Residential School; (Added St. Paul's High School in 1951)	Lebret	SK	1884 (burned down in 1904, 1932)	1969 (Re-opened under the operations of the reserve in 1973 as White Calf Collegiate, but that closed in August 1998)	RC	109	Accidentally exhumed 1 grave and radar detected 2000 anomalies in 2022
Regina Indian Residential School	Regina	SK	1890	1910, demolished in 1948	PB	24	Radar detected 38 potential graves in 2012
Round Lake Indian Residential School	Whitewood	SK	1886	1950	MD	5	
St. Anthony's Indian Residential School (Onion Lake Catholic Indian Residential School) (Joseph Dion was pupil No. 7)	Onion Lake	SK	1891	1968	RC	0	
St. Barnabas Indian Residential School (Onion Lake Indian Residential School)	Onion Lake	SK	1893 (burned down in 1943)	1951	AN	0	
St. Phillips Indian Residential School (Keeseekoose Day School)	Kamsack	SK	1899	1965	RC	6	Radar detected 54 potential graves in 2022
Thunderchild Indian Residential School (Delmas Indian Residential School)	Delmas	SK	1901	1948 (burned down by students)	RC	23	Intentionally exhumed 1 body in 2021
Aklavik Anglican Indian Residential School (All Saints Indian Residential School)	Shingle Point	NWT	1927	1934 (moved to Aklavik due to overcrowding)	AN	59	
Baptist Indian Residential School (Yukon Indian Residential School)	Whitehorse	YT	1900	1968	BP	1	
Carcross Indian Residential School (Forty Mile Boarding School)	Fortymile	YT	1891	1910 (moved to Carcross)	AN	3	
Carcross Indian Residential School (Chooutla Indian Residential School; Caribou Crossing Indian Residential School)	Carcross	YT	1910	1969	AN	24	Radar detected 15 potential graves in 2023
St. Paul's Indian Residential School (St. Paul's Hall)	Dawson	YT	1920	1943	AN	6	
Yukon Hall (residences for local day school students)	Whitehorse	YT	1956	1965	AN	0	
Tranquille School for Mentally Handicapped Indians (Stsmemelt Village)	Kamloops	BC	1972	1978	OO (Non-Denominational)		

== See also ==
- Canadian genocide of Indigenous peoples
- Residential school denialism
- New Zealand Native schools
- Where the Spirit Lives - 1989 film about residential schools
