= Amos Residential School =

Defunct Canadian residential school

Amos Indian Residential School
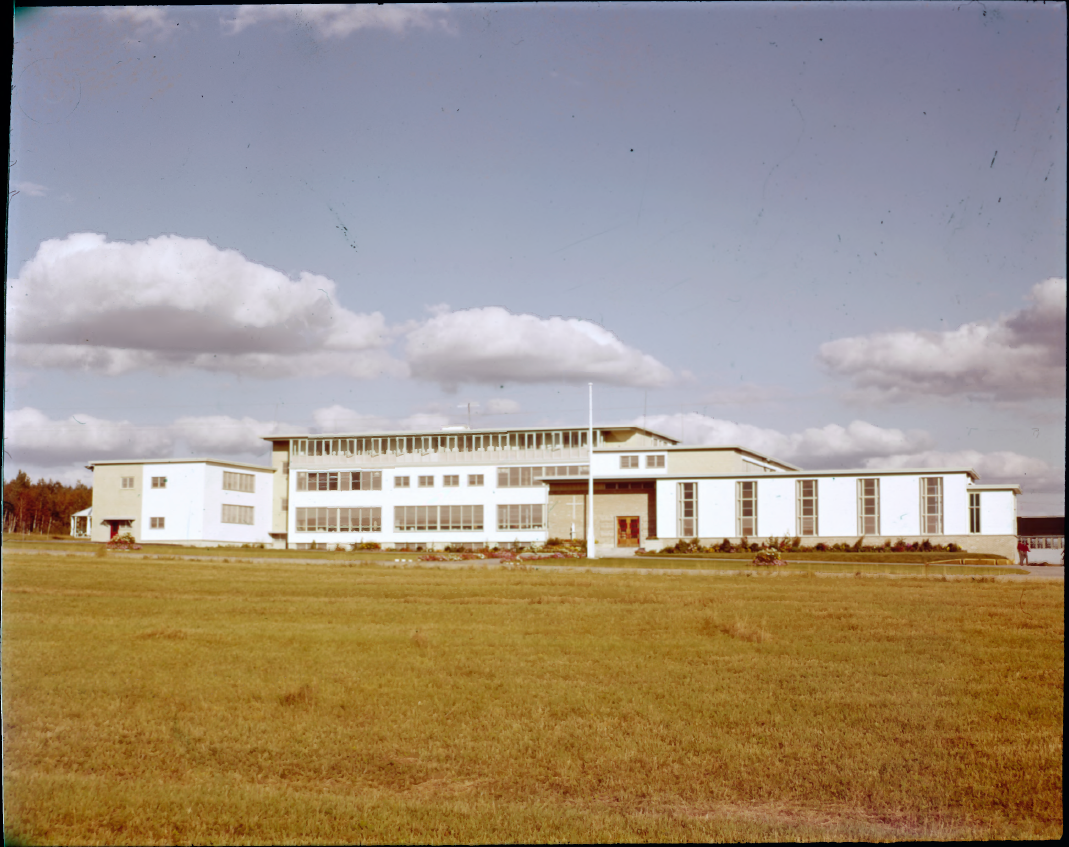
- Amos Indian Residential School (1955-1973), date unknown

Location
- Saint-Marc-de-Figuery, Quebec; Canada; 48.4431574°N 78.0493133°W

Information
- Type: Canadian Indian residential school
- Religious affiliation: Catholic
- Established: 1955
- Closed: 1973
- Authority: Catholic Church in Canada
- Oversight: Department of Indian Affairs and Northern Development
- Gender: Coed
- Enrollment: 200
- Language: English

The Amos Indian Residential School was a Canadian residential school in Quebec, Canada. The school was for Anicinapek and Atikamekw Nehirowisiw children, and operated from 1955 to 1973. It was created by the Canadian federal government and run by the Catholic Church. The school was built in the municipality of Saint-Marc-de-Figuery on the traditional territory of the Anicinape Nation. All buildings associated with the school have since been demolished.

== History ==
When the school was opened the government also set up a farm school, but by 1958 all the livestock for the school had been sold off.

The school had a scandal in 1966 when the priest who worked at the school, Edmond Brouillard, was convicted of sexually abusing six children.

In 2013 survivors of the school came together with the Abitibiwinni First Nation Council and built a monument to the school's history and to act as a form of healing for the survivors of the school.

Two bronze plaques were unveiled as a part of the National Day for Truth and Reconciliation in 2024, as the federal government recognized the historical significance of the school. The minister of the environment and climate change Steven Guilbeault announced the unveiling of the two plaques.

There has been no officially recognized deaths related to the Saint-Marc-de-Figuery residential school but survivors have different memories with one survivor saying that at least three children disappeared never to be seen again. Another survivor recounts going to funeral-like events for children of the school.

== Administration and management ==
In 1955 the school was administered by the Oblates and Grey Sisters. Then in 1962 the federal government had an agreement with the Oblate Indian and Eskimo Commission on management of the school. April 1, 1969, the Federal government had decided to administer until September where the government gave it to the local school district.

== Post WW2 Residential school ==
Unlike previous residential schools, many of the new residential schools like Amos were developed in Quebec after World War II to develop the population of Mid-North Quebec for Indigenous people living in the region. Another goal of the government was to increase the number of Indigenous people attending schools. In the case of Amos, the construction of a new residential school was part of the local population growth and parents desiring an education for their children.

== Oblates and Grey Sisters ==
The Oblates in the 1940s had tried persuading the Department of Indian Affairs that it be mandatory for students to attend school. Once convinced, the government had the Oblates manage the school along with the Grey Sisters. The goal was for these children to be raised with Catholic faith and values. The Oblates had a style of teaching that was strict and harsh, especially compared to what Indigenous students were used to. They protested that they were not eradicating indigenous culture and also denying full responsibility of the sexual abuse happening at the school. The staff from the church in the schools had priests, nuns and lay teachers.

== Operation of the school ==
The curriculum had standard classes like math and French. They had access to workshops such one for students farming. Sports were part of school for further assimilation.

French had to be learned quickly because the staff had no knowledge of Indigenous languages, except for the supervisor. Religious learning was focused on faith, with students not allowed to speak their language unless doing religious practices such as praying. The supervisor showed this with announcements made for prayer in the school in the students' Indigenous languages. Students had their clothing, hair and names changed. Boys and girls were separated for most of the time during school. Students were also not allowed to leave the school. Students lived at the school for most of the year only being able to see and live with their family at Christmas and the summer.

== Children who attended the school ==
The children who attended the school came from the Anicinapek and Atikamekw Nehirowisiw peoples. The Anicinapek from southwest Quebec and the Atikamekw Nehirowisiw from the Mauricie region.

According to Bousquet (2006), residential schools were originally intended “to take in children from ages 7 to 14. In fact, it would later welcome children from 6 (sometimes younger) to 16.”

The children who were forced to attend this school were abused and made to follow strict rules in order to silence their language and their culture. This led to a loss of identity for many survivors who attended the school.

Generally the school consistently was enrolling over 200 students at the school.

== Abuse and hardships experienced by students ==
Many of the students faced difficulty in school. Part of this was getting used to different lifestyles, structures and social structures being completely different from home. Students had the impression of having been treated with no respect with staff having to deal with mistreatment, malnourishment, physical abuse, mental abuse and sexual abuse. Meanwhile, students would be punished. This included not being fed, beaten or locked up in closets.

Abuse was found in the hockey team having players beat for losing.

== Resistance by students and parents ==
Students tried to protest by not eating or telling their parents about the event but without effect.

One student ran away twice and was stopped by the police. Another student had planned an escape plan to leave school. After he escaped and met his parents, they brought him back to the school.

One student who experienced sexual abuse left school and brought back twice by the police, until their father believed them and they moved away. Another child had their parents hide them in order to protect them.

== Impacts on students and parents ==
The survivors of the school reported abuse that affected their identity, skills and culture. Skills that were named by one survivor included the ability to hunt, fish, and to understand their own position within their culture. Survivors noted that there was sexual abuse at the school.

It affected their ability to live back home and also connect with their families after not having been taught the same skills and knowledge. Parents spoke of feeling betrayed by the school. They had accepted it in order to learn. However, they did not think their children would be gone for so long and that they would be abused by staff that they trusted to take care of their children.

== Media coverage, accusations and interviews from survivors ==
The school is accused of having hidden child deaths, with the CBC reporting accounts from multiple survivors and including a disturbing photograph. Reportedly, a meningitis outbreak led to one child death, but there were no official deaths recorded. No found additional sources confirm whether the claim has been rejected or accepted by any institutions.

The CBC has also reported on the effects of the schools on children who were hidden to avoid sending them to school, who had to live in less than normal conditions in order to stay away.

Finally, survivors have spoken of abuse at the school including a report on a member of staff named Édmond Brouillard being convicted for sexually abusing children.
