= Nora Bernard =

Mi'kmaq activist

- Born: 22 September 1935; Millbrook First Nation Reserve
- Died: 27 December 2007 (aged 72); Millbrook First Nation Reserve
- Occupation: Activist

Nora Bernard ONS (September 22, 1935 – December 26, 2007) was a Canadian Mi'kmaq activist who sought compensation for survivors of the Canadian Indian residential school system. She was directly responsible for what became the largest class-action lawsuit in Canadian history, representing an estimated 79,000 survivors; the Canadian government settled the lawsuit in 2005 for more than C$5 billion.

== Early life ==
In 1945, when Bernard was nine years old, her mother was told that if she did not sign the consent forms to send her children to a residential school, the child welfare system would take her children into "protective custody." As a result, Bernard attended the Shubenacadie Indian Residential School for five years.

== Marriage and family ==
In 1955, she married a non-Indigenous man, and consequently lost her legal status under the Indian Act; the relevant section of the Indian Act was repealed in 1985, but this did not automatically lead to reinstatement as a band member. She had to fight to regain status, and it was not until March 2007 that she was voted back into the Millbrook First Nation.

== Activism ==
In the late 1980s, Bernard began searching for other survivors of the Shubenacadie school. In 1995, she began an organization to represent survivors of the Shubenacadie school; she subsequently convinced Halifax lawyer John McKiggan to represent the Shubenacadie survivors in a class-action suit. Bernard filed the first Class Action lawsuit against the Government of Canada seeking compensation for Residential School Survivors. After the Shubenacadie suit became public knowledge, many other survivors' associations across Canada filed similar suits; these were eventually amalgamated into one national lawsuit. In McKiggan's words, "(...) if it wasn't for Nora's efforts, and other survivors like her across Canada, this national settlement never would have happened. (...) After we filed our lawsuit, a number of other students from other schools filed similar class actions."

In 2005, she testified before the House of Commons of Canada about the abuse children suffered in residential schools:

Sexual and physical abuse was not the only abuse that the survivors experienced in these institutions (...) Abuses included such things as being incarcerated through no fault of their own; the introduction of child labour; the withholding of proper food, clothing, and proper education; the loss of language and culture; and no proper medical attention.

== Death ==
On December 27, 2007, Bernard was found dead in her home in Truro, Nova Scotia; although she was originally thought to have died of natural causes, on December 31, police arrested her grandson James Douglas Gloade and charged him with her murder. After consuming prescription drugs and crack, he asked Bernard for money, and she gave him $20. When he came back a second time, Bernard refused to give him more, and he hit her three or four times before using a kitchen knife to slit her throat. On January 23, 2009, Gloade was convicted of manslaughter and sentenced to 15 years in prison. He was released to a halfway house in 2018, but violated conditions of his release and was recaptured by police. He was again released to a halfway house in 2021.

== Legacy and honours ==
In 2008, Bernard was posthumously awarded the Order of Nova Scotia.

In December 2022, Halifax regional council voted to rename Cornwallis Street, in the city's north end, after Nora Bernard. The neighbouring Mi'kmaw Native Friendship Centre and New Horizons Baptist Church had earlier called on council to rename the street, which commemorated Edward Cornwallis, a British governor who sought to drive the Mi'kmaq out of the Nova Scotia peninsula and proclaimed that a bounty would be paid for the scalps of Mi'kmaw people. Halifax council convened a special committee to advise on the matter of municipal assets commemorating Cornwallis. The task force recommended renaming the street. "Nora Bernard Street" topped a public poll of potential new street names. The new street name came into effect on 30 October 2023.

== See also ==
- Nova Scotia Heritage Day
