= Rita Joe =

Miꞌkmaw poet (1932–2007)

- Born: Rita Bernard; March 15, 1932; Whycocomagh, Nova Scotia
- Died: March 20, 2007 (aged 75); Sydney, Nova Scotia
- Occupation: Poetry
- Spouse: Frank Joe
- Children: Eight children; adopted two boys
- Writing career
- Genres: Poetry, Memoir
- Notable awards: National Aboriginal Achievement Award, 1987; Member of the Order of Canada, 1989; Queen's Privy Council for Canada, 1992

Rita Joe, PC CM (born Rita Bernard; March 15, 1932 – March 20, 2007) was a Mi'kmaw poet and songwriter, often referred to as the Poet Laureate of the Mi'kmaq people.

== Biography ==
Rita was born March 15, 1932, in Whycocomagh, Cape Breton Island, Nova Scotia. Her parents were Joseph and Annie Bernard, both of the Mi'kmaq First Nations, and Rita had four siblings. When Rita was five years old, her mother died, and she spent several years in foster care before returning to live with her father and siblings at the Whycocomagh reserve. In 1942, when she was ten years old; she became orphaned. As a result, she was sent to the Shubenacadie Residential School. There, she was forbidden to speak her native language and practice her culture. She had to face physical and mental abuse until she turned sixteen and finished school. Rita had to learn her native language again by talking with Mi’kmaq speakers (people from her same tribe). Shortly after she finished school, she worked at different jobs in Nova Scotia, and then, she moved to Boston. There, she met Frank Joe. In 1954, she married Frank, had eight children and fostered two boys.

In 1978, her first book, The Poems of Rita Joe was published. Over her lifetime she published six other books, including the autobiographical Song of Rita Joe, in which the poet outlined some of her experiences at the Shubenacadie Indian Residential School.

In 1989, Joe was made a Member of the Order of Canada; in 1992, she was called to the Queen's Privy Council for Canada (she is one of the few non-politicians ever appointed); in 1997 she was awarded the National Aboriginal Achievement Award.

In the years before her death, Joe suffered from Parkinson's disease.

== Legacy and influence ==
Rita Joe wrote about residential schools and the experiences of Indigenous people in settler society. A Mi'kmaq poet from Canada, her work addressed these topics and contributed to First Nations literature in Canada.

In January 2016, the National Arts Centre in Ottawa premiered I Lost My Talk. This was a performance based on Joe's poem "I Lost My Talk". The film was directed by Barbara Willis Sweete. The performance sparked a light on the legacy of residential schools in Canada.

In 2018, Halifax transit named a new Halifax Harbour ferry the Rita Joe. In 2023, Joe was the honouree of Nova Scotia's Heritage Day, and a campaign was launched to represent her on Canada's $20 bill.

=== Rita Joe Memorial Literacy Day ===
Each year, Allison Bernard Memorial High School in Eskasoni First Nation, Nova Scotia, holds a literacy day in Rita Joe's honour, with the "hope that students would be inspired to read, write, and create their own stories" and revitalize the Mi'kmaq language. The first Rita Joe Memorial Literacy Day was held in 2012. Festivities include a writing contest for students and visits and workshops from professional writers and artists.

=== The Rita Joe National Song project ===
Inspired by Rita Joe's poem, "I Lost My Talk," and her challenge for Indigenous youth to "find their voices, share their stories, and celebrate their talents," Canada's National Arts Centre launched the Rita Joe National Song project. The project called on youth from five First Nations' communities in Canada to write, record, and create a music video for a song based on Joe's poem. The videos were debuted along with the premiere of the National Arts Centre Orchestra's "Spirit Prevails," also based on Joe's poem, in January, 2016, in Ottawa. Reviewing the NACO's multimedia performance, Natasha Gautier stated, "The writing is eminently accessible but never simplistic or condescending. [Composer John] Estacio has a wonderful sense of orchestration, evocative but not cliché."

== Works ==
- Poems of Rita Joe (1978, ISBN 9780920582008)
- Song of Eskasoni (1988, ISBN 9780920304853)
- Lnu And Indians We're Called (1991, ISBN 0-921556-22-5)
- Kelusultiek (1995, ISBN 9781895306385)
- Song of Rita Joe: Autobiography of a Mi'kmaq Poet (1996, ISBN 0-8032-7594-3)
- The Mi'kmaq Anthology (1997, ISBN 9781895900040)
- We are the dreamers: recent and early poetry (1999, ISBN 978-1-895415-46-9)
- For the Children (2008, ISBN 9781895415988)
- The Blind Man's Eyes: New and Selected Poetry (2015, ISBN 9781926908380)

== Honours ==
- In 1989 she was made a Member in the Order of Canada.
- In 1992 she was made a Member of the Queen's Privy Council for Canada.
- In 1993 she was awarded an honorary Doctor of Laws from Dalhousie University.
- In 1997 she was awarded an honorary Doctorate of Letters from the University College of Cape Breton (now Cape Breton University).
- In 1997 she received a National Aboriginal Achievement Award (now Indspire Award).
- In 1998 she was awarded an honorary Doctor of Humane Letters from Mount Saint Vincent University.

== Quotes ==
- "Indians have in the past been portrayed as the bad guys, I write the positive image of my people, the Mi'kmaq."
- "When I started the first time writing, I was trying to inspire all minorities with my work. To make others happy with my work is what I wanted to do."
- "My greatest wish is that there will be more writing from my people, and that our children will read it. I have said again and again that our history would be different if it had been expressed by us."
- "The positive outlook that I have worked on for so long now turns me off the negative. I look for the good."

== See also ==
- Nova Scotia Heritage Day
