= Elsie Charles Basque =

Mi'kmaq teacher and activist (1916–2016)

Elsie Josephine Charles Basque CM
- Born: May 12, 1916; Hectanooga, Nova Scotia
- Died: April 11, 2016 (aged 99)
- Occupations: Teacher, activist
- Known for: Order of Canada awardee
- Spouse: Isaac Basque

Elsie Josephine Charles Basque (1916-2016) was a Mi’kmaq known as the first member of her tribe to earn a teaching certificate. She became a noted educator and was a recipient of the Order of Canada in 2009.

== Biography ==
Basque was born on May 12, 1916, to Joe Charles and Margaret Labrador in Hectanooga, Digby County. She was three years old when her mother, Margaret, left the family and his father contracted tuberculosis. His father became a tour guide to wealthy Americans when he got better. He taught his daughter how to fish and hunt.

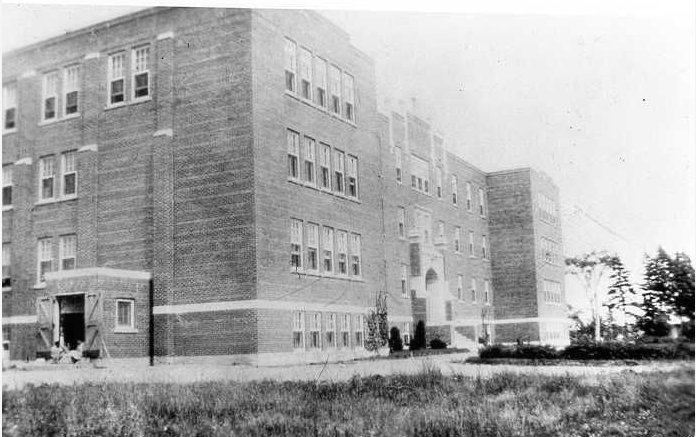
Shubenacadie Residential School, photographed by Elsie Basque when she attended the school

When Basque was 13, her father sent her to study at a residential school. She then attended the Shubenacadie Indian Residential School from 1930 to 1932, years that she later characterized as "wasted". She entered the school to begin grade 8 but was still in the same grade two years later when she left. She finished high school in 1936 at Meteghan's Sacred Heart Academy.

In 1937, she earned her teacher's certificate from the Provincial Normal College, becoming the first Mi'kmaq to do so. After obtaining her teaching license, she attempted to apply for a teaching job at Inverness County. After a meeting, the county school inspector asked her to go home, noting that members of the community would oppose having a Mi’kmaq teaching their children. By 1939, she was employed at the Indian Day School, a newly opened school for Mi’kmaq children in Indian Brook.

At Indian Brook, Basque met her husband Isaac, a farmer. They got married and had four children.

When Basque transferred to a school in Cape Breton Island, she became the first Aboriginal person to teach in a non-Native school. In 1951, Basque relocated to Boston, Massachusetts and lived there with her family for almost 30 years. Her husband was employed at Algonquin Gas Transmission Company while she did public relations work. When her children were old enough, Basque returned to teaching and worked for the Boston Indian Council. She lectured on topics that include Indian elderly, Mi'kmaq culture, and the status of American Indian people. She was active in promoting the rights of First Nations and Native American peoples, particularly seniors. A paper that she wrote detailing the problems of the native American elderly was sent to the U.S. Senate as a position paper. She also served on the Elders' Board of Directors for the Mi'kmawey Debert Cultural Centre.

Basque was selected as a member of the Order of Canada on November 4, 2009, for her pioneering work as an educator and for advocating the works of seniors and aboriginal people. She was awarded an honorary doctorate in 2005 by the Universite Sainte-Anne.

Basque died on April 11, 2016, at her home in Hectanooga.
