= Family Day (Canada) =

Canadian public holiday

- Official name: Family Day (AB, BC, NB, ON, SK); Louis Riel Day (MB); Nova Scotia Heritage Day (NS); Islander Day (PEI)
- Observed by: Alberta, British Columbia, New Brunswick, Ontario, Saskatchewan, Manitoba, Nova Scotia, Prince Edward Island
- Date: Third Monday in February
- 2025 date: February 17
- 2026 date: February 16
- 2027 date: February 15
- 2028 date: February 21
- Frequency: Annual

In most provinces of Canada, the third Monday in February is observed as a regional statutory holiday, typically known in general as Family Day (French: Jour de la famille)—though some provinces use their own names, as they celebrate the day for different reasons. The third Monday of February is observed as "Family Day" in the provinces of Alberta, British Columbia (BC), New Brunswick, Ontario, and Saskatchewan; as Louis Riel Day in Manitoba; as Nova Scotia Heritage Day in Nova Scotia; and as Islander Day in Prince Edward Island.

In Canada more generally, the third Monday in February has also been celebrated as Heritage Day, though this is not as an official holiday. This "Heritage Day" is observed by some in celebration of the country's collective history, architecture, and cultural heritage.

In Quebec and the three territories, the third Monday in February is a regular working day. The same is true in Newfoundland and Labrador except in Corner Brook, where it is an unnamed civic holiday. In Yukon, however, one Friday in February (typically the last/near-last Friday)—rather than a Monday—is deemed Yukon Heritage Day.

Two-thirds of Canadians live in a province that observes a February statutory holiday. Some provinces have changed the observance day of their holiday to match the other provinces. As Family Day is not a federal statutory holiday, employees of the federal government (such as public servants and postal workers) work on this day in all provinces. The timing of Family Day also coincides with the United States' holiday of Presidents' Day (also known as Washington's Birthday, among other names).

== Family Day ==
Family Day
- Observed by: Alberta, British Columbia, New Brunswick, Ontario, Saskatchewan
- Date: Third Monday in February
- 2025 date: February 17
- 2026 date: February 16
- 2027 date: February 15
- 2028 date: February 21
- Frequency: annual

=== Alberta ===
Family Day in Alberta was first celebrated in 1990, making it the only province to have a statutory holiday in February until Saskatchewan began observing the day in 2007.

The holiday was proclaimed by Lieutenant Governor Helen Hunley, on the advice of her premier, Don Getty. Premier Getty said that it was important for Albertans to spend time with their families, and that this holiday would emphasize the importance of family values. The date was chosen to coincide with Washington's Birthday, in order to avoid disrupting trade with the United States.

Getty faced considerable criticism at the time; many employers felt an additional statutory holiday was an unnecessary financial burden. In response, Heritage Day was downgraded to a civic holiday, meaning employers would not be required to observe it. Under Alberta law, the employer may choose to observe Heritage Day as a general holiday, under which rules applying to general holiday pay will be used.

=== Saskatchewan ===
In October 2005 the Premier of Saskatchewan, Lorne Calvert, proposed Family Day for the province, starting in 2007. The bill for the Labour Standards Amendment Act, 2006, was introduced in the legislature on November 1, 2006, and received Royal Assent on December 6. The Act officially declares Family Day on the third Monday of each February; the first Family Day in Saskatchewan was February 19, 2007.

=== Ontario ===
During the Ontario provincial election in 2007, Dalton McGuinty (Liberal Party) promised that, if re-elected premier, he would establish a provincial holiday in February. On October 12, 2007, the provincial government established Family Day on the third Monday in February, to be first observed on February 18, 2008. Its creation raised Ontario's number of statutory holidays to nine per year. However, this holiday does not necessarily add to the number of holidays Ontarians receive, because employers can substitute any non-statutory holidays that employees may already be receiving in lieu of this day. Many employers have substituted the popular Civic Holiday, which falls on the first Monday in August. Although the Civic Holiday is enjoyed by millions every year, it is not designated as a public (statutory) holiday under the Employment Standards Act, and workers may have to choose one holiday or the other, based on their contract, union negotiations, service requirements, etc.

=== British Columbia ===
In British Columbia, a private member's bill to establish Family Day on the third Monday in February was introduced in the BC Legislature by Liberal MLA Bob Chisholm in 1994 but failed to pass. Although there were renewed calls to introduce Family Day in BC between 2007 and 2011, it was opposed by the BC Chamber of Commerce and the government of Gordon Campbell.

On January 10, 2011, while running for the leadership of the BC Liberal Party, Christy Clark proposed establishing a Family Day holiday on the third Monday of February. Clark subsequently became premier; the Speech from the Throne, delivered on October 3, 2011, said that BC would observe its first Family Day on February 18, 2013.

In 2012, a two-week consultation process was held in order to determine if British Columbians preferred the holiday to fall on the second or third Monday in February. On May 28, 2012, it was announced that Family Day would be observed on the second Monday in February each year, starting February 11, 2013. As this did not coincide with Presidents Day, it also provided two consecutive long weekends for tourism, particularly at BC's many ski resorts.

On February 9, 2018, the Government of British Columbia announced that Family Day would be moved to the 3rd Monday in February in 2019, to align their holiday with the rest of those provinces who observe it on that Monday.

=== New Brunswick ===
On September 5, 2010, while campaigning for re-election in New Brunswick, Premier Shawn Graham promised to establish Family Day in his province if his Liberal Party was returned to government, Graham did not win re-election.

However, the Liberals returned to government in September 2014; subsequently, in February 2016, the Liberal Government started studying the implementation of Family Day. On April 26, 2017, Premier Brian Gallant announced that New Brunswick would become the newest province to observe Family Day, beginning on February 19, 2018.

== Heritage Day ==
Nationally, the third Monday in February has sometimes been celebrated as Heritage Day. This is not an official national holiday nor is it observed by the federal government. However, it is observed by some in celebration of the country's collective history, architecture, and cultural heritage.

Heritage Day was created in 1973 by the Heritage Canada Foundation in order to preserve and promote Canada's historical, natural, and architectural heritage. Each year, Heritage Canada chooses a different theme for the Heritage Day celebrations. These celebrations can also be week-long, beginning with the third Monday of February, in which case it is known as Heritage Week.

Several attempts have been made since 1973 to try and make Heritage Day a statutory holiday, but to no avail. (The federal government does, however, celebrate National Flag Day annually on February 15, but it is not a holiday.)

== Regional holidays ==
=== Louis Riel Day (Manitoba) ===
Louis Riel Day
- Official name: Louis Riel Day
- Observed by: Manitoba
- Date: Third Monday in February
- 2025 date: February 17
- 2026 date: February 16
- 2027 date: February 15
- 2028 date: February 21
- Frequency: annual

Louis Riel Day (French: Journée Louis Riel) is recognized as a statutory holiday (or "general holiday") in Manitoba by law; as such, (most) employees in the province either have this day off with pay, or are paid differently if they do work. The name is in honour of Louis Riel, the Métis leader who led the fight to maintain aboriginal and francophone rights. The federal Government of Canada (and perhaps other parts of Canada) also celebrates a "Louis Riel Day" but on November 16, the anniversary of Riel's death. This day, however, is not a recognized holiday.

In February 2007, it was reported that the Manitoba government was considering a February holiday. That year, Manitoba school students were invited to name the new holiday; 114 responded with suggestions that reflected Manitoba's citizenship, history, culture, arts, sports, and significant historical individuals. Some suggestions were "Bison Break", "Spirited Energy Day", and "Winnipeg Jets Day". The winning entry was "Louis Riel Day", which was submitted by 11 schools who were subsequently awarded CA$1,000 grants to purchase materials for their school library.

Legislation proclaiming the third Monday in February as "Louis Riel Day" was passed by Manitoba's Legislative Assembly on April 17, 2007, and first celebrated February 18, 2008. This holiday also coincides with the annual celebration of the Festival Du Voyageur in Winnipeg.

=== Islander Day (Prince Edward Island) ===
Islander Day
- Official name: Islander Day
- Observed by: Prince Edward Island
- Date: Third Monday in February
- 2025 date: February 17
- 2026 date: February 16
- 2027 date: February 15
- 2028 date: February 21
- Frequency: annual

The provincial government of Prince Edward Island introduced Islander Day (French: Fête des Insulaires) in 2009, due to the rising trend of a holiday in February. It was first held on the second Monday of February in 2009, rather than the third Monday, as in other provinces. This incongruity effected much controversy, as businesses suffered as a result of being out of sync with their partners in other provinces, as well as the United States, which celebrates Presidents Day on the third Monday of February. In April 2009, Provincial Attorney General Gerard Greenan moved the holiday to the third Monday in February.

=== Nova Scotia Heritage Day ===
Nova Scotia Heritage Day
- Official name: Nova Scotia Heritage Day
- Observed by: Nova Scotia
- Date: Third Monday in February
- 2025 date: February 17
- 2026 date: February 16
- 2027 date: February 15
- 2028 date: February 21
- Frequency: annual

After the provincial Liberal Party was elected in 2013, its leader Stephen McNeil said that he planned to create a February statutory holiday in Nova Scotia. In December 2013, the government introduced a bill to create a holiday on the third Monday in February, starting in 2015.

The permanent name for the holiday, Nova Scotia Heritage Day (French: Jour du patrimoine de la Nouvelle-Écosse), was announced on June 26, 2014. Each year it honours a different person; the first was Viola Desmond. The first twelve, covering 2015 to 2026, were chosen by a three-member government appointed panel from suggestions offered by Nova Scotian school children. Other days have or will recognize Mi'kmaq heritage, Africville, Joseph Howe, Edward Francis Arab, Nora Bernard, Carrie Best, J. Willie Comeau, Grand-Pré National Historic Site, William Hall, Rita Joe, Maud Lewis, and Mona Louise Parsons.

=== Civic Holiday (Corner Brook, NL) ===
Civic Holiday
- Official name: Civic Holiday
- Observed by: Corner Brook, NL
- Date: Third Monday in February
- 2025 date: February 17
- 2026 date: February 16
- 2027 date: February 15
- 2028 date: February 21
- Frequency: annual

Civic Holiday is marked by the city of Corner Brook, Newfoundland and Labrador, to coincide with the first weekend of its annual ten-day Winter Carnival. It is sometimes referred to as Carnival Day because of its long association with the festival, which was first celebrated in 1973. Most businesses are closed for the day, including provincial offices, even though it is not a province-wide holiday. The post offices remain open, as well as local schools, with the exception of grades k - 6, (which enjoy 3 hours off in the afternoon). It's not a federal holiday.

=== Yukon Heritage Day ===
Yukon Heritage Day
- Official name: Yukon Heritage Day
- Observed by: Yukon
- Date: No consensus. Arguably last Friday of February, Friday before last Sunday of February, etc.
- Frequency: annual

Yukon Heritage Day (French: Journée du Patrimoine du Yukon) is a holiday observed in Yukon on the Friday before the last Sunday of February. (This date is disputed by some.) Although the government and many businesses are closed on this day, it is not a statutory holiday.

== Elsewhere ==
Governments in the remaining jurisdictions without February holidays have come under some pressure to harmonize. Ontario's enactment of Family Day has meant the Canadian financial sector, including the Toronto Stock Exchange, largely shuts down on this date. In 2008, federal NDP leader Jack Layton proposed that it be made a federal holiday. Not being a federal holiday, federally regulated workplaces (such as the post office) work on Family Day regardless of the day's status in the respective provinces.

== Origin ==
Despite the emphasis on positive social values, Family Day has controversial roots in Alberta as a means of political damage control. The late Progressive Conservative Party leader Don Getty had called a provincial election for March 20, 1989. At that time in 1988, new seat belt laws had been passed, and Getty was unhappy with Sun columnist Don Wanagas for labeling him a "closet seat-belt abuser." The premier at a media scrum called out, "I maybe whack my kids, beat my wife, but I've never abused a seat belt in my life." The offensive quip received intense backlash from the public. Soon afterward, on August 18, 1988, Getty's 31-year-old son Dale was arrested in an Edmonton motel room for attempting to sell cocaine to an undercover Mountie. Six months later, the 1989 Throne Speech announced a new February holiday allowing families to spend more time together.
