= Shubenacadie Indian Residential School =

Defunct Canadian residential school

Coordinates: 45.096934°N 63.406806°W

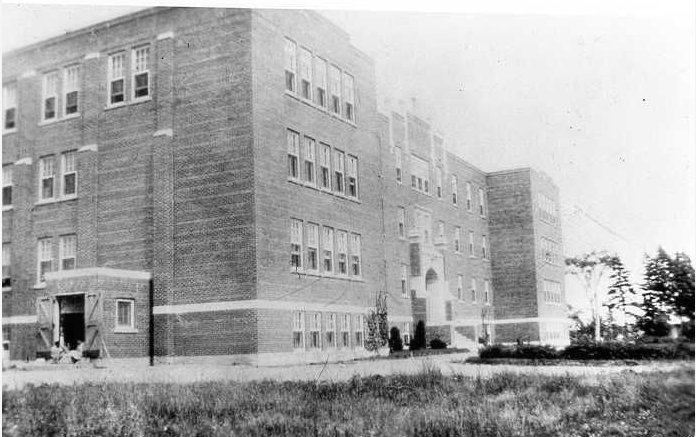
- Shubenacadie Indian Residential School (1930)
- Shubenacadie, Nova Scotia

Information
- Religious affiliation: Roman Catholic
- Established: February 5, 1930
- Closed: June 22, 1967

The Shubenacadie Indian Residential School operated as part of Canadian Indian residential school system in Shubenacadie, Nova Scotia between 1930 and 1967. It was the only one in the Maritimes. The schools were funded by the federal Department of Indian Affairs. The derelict building was destroyed by fire in 1986 and subsequently demolished.

== Construction ==
Construction of the school began in 1928 on farm land purchased from George Gay. The school was the only residential school in the Maritimes operated by the Canadian government. It was to be staffed by the Roman Catholic Order Sisters of Charity of Saint Vincent de Paul (Halifax). The goal at first was to provide education for orphans or neglected children on Maritime reserves. However, just before it opened, Duncan Campbell Scott of Canada's Department of Indian and Northern Affairs, expanded its mandate to be an option to the small day schools which already existed on reserves. The school opened for staff and administrators in May 1929 and in its expanded role was intended to educate 150 students. The first children arrived on February 5, 1930. From its founding, the school suffered from poor construction, poor maintenance and overcrowding.

Mi'kmaw and Wolastoqiyik children from Nova Scotia, Prince Edward Island, New Brunswick, and Quebec attended Shubenacadie Indian Residential School. Approximately 10% of Mi'kmaq children lived at the institution. (Note: The Mi'kmaq population went from 5000 to 6000 during this time period. 30% (1500) of the Mi'kmaq population was under age 17. Approximately 150 lived at the institution on an annual basis.) Over 1,000 children are estimated to have been placed in the institution over 37 years.

From 1929 until 1956, the school was operated under the auspices of the Roman Catholic Archdiocese of Halifax-Yarmouth. From 1956 until its closure in 1967, the school was operated by the Missionary Oblates of Mary Immaculate.

== Underfunding ==
For the first two decades of the institutions existence it was underfunded by the government, extending the poor conditions of the reserve into the institution. The result was a facility that was often cold and leaked. Teachers were paid less than half of their counterparts working in the provincial schools. Poverty also led to chronic hunger and malnutrition in the school. In 1945, one researcher defined the nutrition at the school as "overwhelmingly poor". A researcher the following year noted that the lack of attention to the issue was "utterly disgusting".

In 1950, the salary of the teachers doubled, which almost elevated them to the same level as their provincial counterparts. Despite the increases in wages, throughout the 1950s and 1960s, the average teacher was there 2–3 years. In 1965, there was a turnover of 30%. In 1956, with the fourth principal, food improved. Scott Hamilton, an anthropologist at Lakehead University in Thunder Bay, Ontario, said that "at times residential schools dealt with many sick children at once; had limited medical and diagnostic capacity; were overcrowded with kids who were society’s most vulnerable – not unlike the tragic numbers of deaths in nursing homes due to COVID-19."

== School attendance ==
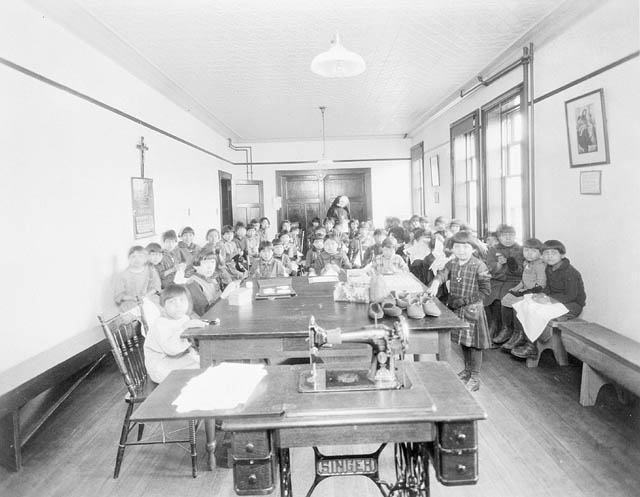
Class of Mi’kmaq girls in 1929

Those who were placed in the institution during the first twenty years agree that there were serious problems with the institution: poor living conditions, corporal punishment, over-crowding, lack of academic education, forced farm labour, hunger, racist curriculum, and children punished for speaking the Mi’kmaq language. One survivor of the institution, William Henry, reported that "Within those [first] few days, you had to learn, because otherwise you’re gonna get your head knocked off. Anyway, you learned everything. You learned to obey. And one of the rules that you didn't break, you obey, and you were scared, you were very scared.'

The formula for funding was on a per-child basis. To raise money, the number of children placed in the institution was increased. The school was built for 125 students; however, in the first year 146 children were placed in the institution, 62 students were in the single grade 1 class. By 1938, 175 children were placed in the institution to try to make up for the financial hardship the institution faced. In 1957, there were 160 students, divided among four classrooms. The inspector in 1957 indicated that children required "much more individual attention".

In the 1960s, the average was 123 students per year; in 1968 it was 120 children and the following and final year dropped to 60.

== Corporal punishment ==
Numerous Mi’kmaq who attended the school reported the staff using corporal punishment during the first two decades of the institution's existence. The first principal allegedly knocked out a fifteen-year-old in front of a class by punching him in the face. Many Mi’kmaq who attended the institution reported being sexually abused by staff. One Mi’kmaq person alleged that his sister died within 24 hours of being assaulted by staff. In June 1934, 19 boys were severely beaten by the principal for stealing, which was supported by the Halifax Chronicle. There were also allegations of locking children in rooms for days at a time.

Chief Dan Francis (1931) protested to Indian Affairs of the conditions at the institution after its first year of operation: "I thought that the school was built for Indian children to learn to read and write, Not for slaves and prisoners like a jail… one Indian boy of this reserve was so beaten by Father Mackey he was laid out for seven days." In 1936, Indian Agent R. H. Butts of Sydney Mines wrote to Indian affairs to complain about the cruelty at the school. Survivor William Hearney reported he was strapped and had his mouth washed out with soap for speaking his Mi'kmaw language. The violence is alleged to have continued until the second principal arrived at the school in 1944.

== Academic standards ==
Initially, the institution focused the children primarily on agricultural education and not academic education. In 1936, Indian Agent Ed Harvey of Lequille, Nova Scotia and Agent R. H. Butts of Sydney Mines wrote to Indian affairs to criticize the school for focusing too much on labour and not enough on the classroom. Two years later, in 1939, 2 of the 150 residents made Grade 8, including 15 children who had been there for 10 years. By 1944, only 4 of 146 residents made it to grade 6. In 1946, Indian Affairs regulated that same amount of time needed to be spent on labour as in public school. With the arrival of the second principal, the institution increased its focus on academics and the focus on farm labour decreased. In 1961, industrial arts and home economics for children under grade 7 was dropped. In 1964, only 9 of 110 students reached grade 8. In 1965, the Herald reported that the average achievement was grade 8, while only 2% went beyond grade 8.

The curriculum defined natives as "savages", "Squaw" and "buck". Narratives focused on Europeans discovering a "New World" and civilizing drunken natives. The children were forbidden to speak Mi’kmaq. There are reports of children being beaten as a result of not speaking English. One chief protested in the Truro Daily News in 1931 that in the institution, "everything Indian is to be forever obliterated and cast into a bottomless pit." With the arrival of the fourth principal in 1956, staff no longer punished students for speaking Mi'kmaq language.

Rose Salmons, a former nun who taught at the school recalled in 2015 how she was ill-prepared for teaching at Shubenacadie when she became one of the 12 nuns teaching at the residential school. She said, "We certainly didn't have any training for dealing with children who were taken from their homes, and who really needed love." According to Salmons, teachers were forbidden from expressing kindness or support. "It was written down: we were not to show affection for the children."

== Dividing families ==
Against the orders of the Catholic Church, the Institution took children against their parents' wishes. Some children who attended the institution were orphans, other children were placed in the institution by their parents, while, as in contemporary child protection cases, other parents were forced to surrender their children. The children were forbidden to go home even during summer break until the 1945, despite parents' wishes and willingness to pay transportation costs or even to go home to the local reserve of Shubenacadie. They were not allowed home for holidays until the mid-1950s. In 1939, some parents arrived at the institution at Christmas to take home their children. The institution contacted the RCMP and the parents were escorted off the property without their children. Despite the efforts of their parents, three children never saw their parents for 9 years.

As with contemporary group homes for children in protective care against their will, numerous Mi'kmaq children tried to escape but were eventually tracked down and returned to the institution. On 7 July 1937, Andrew Julian, a student at the Shubenacadie School, decided not to join the other boys who were milking the dairy cows and escaped, heading for Truro, and was not caught until the end of the month, more than 400 km away from the school in Cape Breton. One boy, Steven Labobe, ran back to his home on Prince Edward Island, and the principal decided to not demand his return.

Again, with the arrival of the fourth principal in 1956, children were allowed to return home for holidays. By 1960, students were no longer forced to attend the institution. Residential schools had long-standing impacts on Mi'kmaw families. Genine Paul-Dimitracopoulos told the Commission that learning what the Shubenacadie school was like, helped her understand "how we grew up because my mom never really showed us love when we were kids coming up. She, when I was hurt or cried, she was never there to console you or to hug you. If I hurt myself she would never give me a hug and tell me it would be okay. I didn’t understand why."

== Closure ==
The institution was closed after 37 years on 22 June 1967. The site was purchased by a private owner but few alternate uses could be found for the structure. The school building was destroyed by fire in 1986. The school's site is now occupied by a plastics factory although a few staff houses remain and the road to the school is still named "Indian School Road".

== Afterward ==
After the school was closed, provincial child protection and welfare services stepped in and many children were put into foster homes. Child protection and welfare services continue to apprehend aboriginal children. In 2014, in Nova Scotia 21.4% of native children are in care, against their parents' wishes, compared with 4% in the overall population.

The Oblates apologized in 1991 for their role in attempting to assimilate Indigenous people, and the physical and sexual abuse that occurred at residential schools. The Sisters of Charity of Halifax, which staffed the residential school in Shubenacadie, apologized at a TRC hearing in 2011.Archbishop Austen-Emile Burke gave an apology in 1992 in Indian Brook and at Millbrook in 1993 for the damage caused by the residential school in Shubenacadie. Archbishop Brian Dunn reiterated that apology in June 2021. In 1995, Nora Bernard started the Association for the survivors of the Shubenacadie Indian Residential School. Nin hundred Mi’kmaq joined the group. In 1997, they filed a class action lawsuit against the government. Eventually a $1.9 million lawsuit was settled at the national level, the largest historical redress agreement in the world.

In 2012 a monument to the suffering and injustice created by the school was installed at the education and drug rehabilitation centre on the We’koqma’q First Nation in Whycocomagh, Nova Scotia. Mi’kmaq Grand Chief Ben Sylliboy who went to the school when he was six in 1947 and helped at the unveiling said the monument was needed to remind people not to let such a tragedy happen again. In terms of retaining the Mi’kmaq language, in 2014, 55% of Mi’kmaq homes use at least some Mi’kmaq language, 33% of children can speak the language. For the Maliseet, the situation is much worse with only 60 people left for whom their own language is their mother tongue.

The Nova Scotia government and the Mi’kmaq community have made the Mi’kmaq Kina’ matnewey, which is the most successful First Nation Education Program in Canada. In 1982, the first Mi’kmaq-operated school opened in Nova Scotia. By 1997, all education for Mi’kmaq on reserves were given the responsibility for their own education. There are now 11 band run schools in Nova Scotia. Now Nova Scotia has the highest rate of retention of aboriginal students in schools in the country. More than half the teachers are Mi’kmaq. From 2011 to 2012 there was a 25% increase of Mi’kmaq students going to university. Atlantic Canada has the highest rate of aboriginal students attending university in the country.

The former Shubenacadie Indian Residential School was designated a national historic site in July 2020. Although the school building is no longer standing, the site of the former school is a place of remembrance and healing for some Survivors and their descendants, who wish to preserve the Indian Residential School history in the Maritimes.

== Notable Mi’kmaq who lived at institution ==
- Rita Joe
- Nora Bernard
- Elsie Charles Basque (1930-1932)
- Grand Chief Ben Sylliboy
- Isabelle Knockwood
- Noel Knockwood
- Noel Doucette (1945–51) (154) – in 1967 led the way for the closure of the school

== See also ==
- List of Indian residential schools in Canada

== Works cited ==
- Chris Benjamin. Indian School Road: Legacies of the Shubenacadie Residential School. Nimbus Press. 2014
- Reid, John G. (2009). "Empire, the Maritime Colonies, and the Supplanting of Mi'kma'ki/Wulstukwik, 1780-1820". Acadiensis. 38 (2): 78–97. JSTOR 41501739.
