= Pelican Lake Indian Residential School =

Canadian Indian Residential School in Sioux Lookout, Ontario

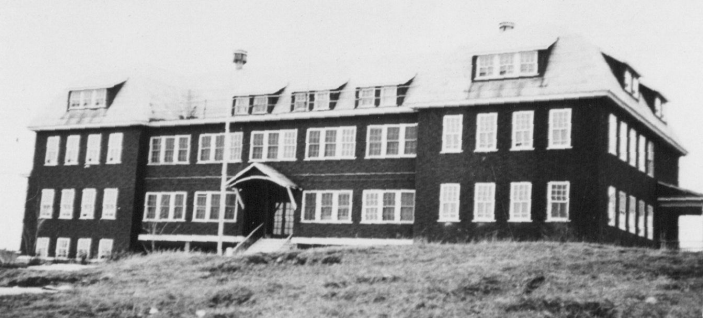
Pelican Lake Residential School

The Pelican Lake Indian Residential School—also known as Pelican Falls Indian Residential School and Sioux Lookout Indian Residential School—was a Canadian Indian Residential School in Sioux Lookout, Ontario, that operated from 1929 through 1969. While it was in operation, the school took Ojibway and Cree students from both Treaty Three and Treaty Nine territories in northern Ontario and eastern Manitoba. A former student of the school reported that students experienced physical, psychological, and sexual abuse while attending.

== History ==
Pelican Lake Indian Residential School was established in 1926 and officially opened in 1929. The school was one of the approximately three dozen schools operated by the Anglican Church of Canada. It was the state-enforced Indian Residential School for Ojibway and Cree students from both Treaty Three and Treaty Nine territories in northern Ontario and eastern Manitoba.

When it initially opened, it housed a total of 125 students, both boys and girls; this number increased to 150 by the late 1940s. Like most residential schools, the school was designed in a way that the male and female students had limited interaction with each other. Usually, students were removed from their families and brought to the school when they were six years old and stayed until they were 12.

When the school first opened, students spent a half-day in the classroom, and a half-day doing general labor. This labor was gendered, with young boys doing physical labour such as carpentry, and the girls doing more domestic tasks such as laundry and cooking. In 1947 the school transitioned to a full-day school system. As documented by the Church itself, the conditions of the school were poor. In 1946 the General Synod of the Anglican Church of Canada set up an Indian Work Investigation Commission to review and raise the standards in its schools. After a three-year investigation it was recommended that Pelican Lake be closed as it was deemed substandard. The Anglican Bishop at the time successfully lobbied to keep the school in operation.

Pelican Lake Residential School changed ownership in 1969. The federal government took over administration of the school in the same year and turned it into a hostel. The hostel remained in operation until it was closed in 1978.

== Abuse and lawsuit ==
Many former students of Pelican Lake describe experiencing physical, psychological and sexual abuse while at the school. Physical abuse came in many different forms including poor living conditions and corporal punishment for speaking a traditional language. Rather than attending class, some students were required to spend the day working. Psychological abuse began with the act of taking small children away from their families. This abuse continued within the school and included actions such as public humiliation for bed wetting. Many residential school survivors were also sexually abused in various ways. Over a dozen students from Pelican Lake have come forward stating they were sexually assaulted while attending the school.

The lasting impacts of residential schools also include the heightened rate of disability amongst Indigenous peoples compared to non-Indigenous peoples. Abuse suffered in residential schools continues to impact the mental health of Indigenous communities. Indigenous peoples also experience a higher rate of disability due to heightened "rates of injury, accident, violence, self-destructive or suicidal behaviour and illness." These are a result of the negative health impacts of residential schools for the survivors and the subsequent generations in the family.

In 1996, Leonard Hands, an Anglican priest who worked at the school during the 1960s, was charged with 19 counts of indecent assault. He entered a guilty plea and was sentenced to four years in prison. The case was initiated by Garnet Angeconeb who was one of the first individuals to begin publicly discussing the abuse at the school. Hands remains the only individual who has been held criminally responsible for a role in the abuse at Pelican Lake Residential School.

== Physical education ==
Until World War II many residential schools employed very regimented exercise with limited team sports. In the 1950s, there was an increase in the role of sports teams at many residential schools, as government policy surrounding the goals of residential schools themselves changed. Rather than trying to eliminate Indigenous peoples, the school's goal was to push Indigenous individuals to integrate into society, erasing their culture and familial ties. Hockey was seen as a way to assert more control over the pupils. Named the Sioux Black Hawks, the team of all boys started with no experience skating. The team was initiated by Gifford Swartman, superintendent of the town's Indian agency, and telephone company owner Art Schade. The students were provided equipment with assistance from local businesses and an outdoor rink was built to help them prepare for play against Sioux and District Bantam league. After a couple years of playing against neighboring Indigenous and non-Indigenous the team improved, and began winning competitions.

In the spring of 1951, the Department of Indian Affairs paid for the team to go on a tour of southern Ontario. Although the department stated there were not enough funds to adequately improve the conditions of the school, the team travelled to Ottawa and Toronto. The team and the trip were publicized and was used by administrators as a way to promote the school. The travelling team consisted of ten Ojibway and three Cree students, including Albert Carpenter, Ernie Wesley and Jerry Ross. Swartman, Sioux Lookout mayor Bill Fuller, and residential school teacher Bruce McCully, serving as team coach, accompanied the students on the tour. During the trip the team met with the Premier of Ontario and the Governor General of Canada. The experiences of students who played on the Sioux Lookout Black Hawks has been documented in the Crossing The Red Line Project led by Janice Forsyth and Alexandra Giancarlo.

== Since the school closure ==
In 1978, the Pelican Lake Residential School was torn down. Today, in its place sits the Pelican Falls First Nations High School and Centre (PFFNHS). PFFNHS accepts students from 24 First Nation communities and is controlled by local First Nations.

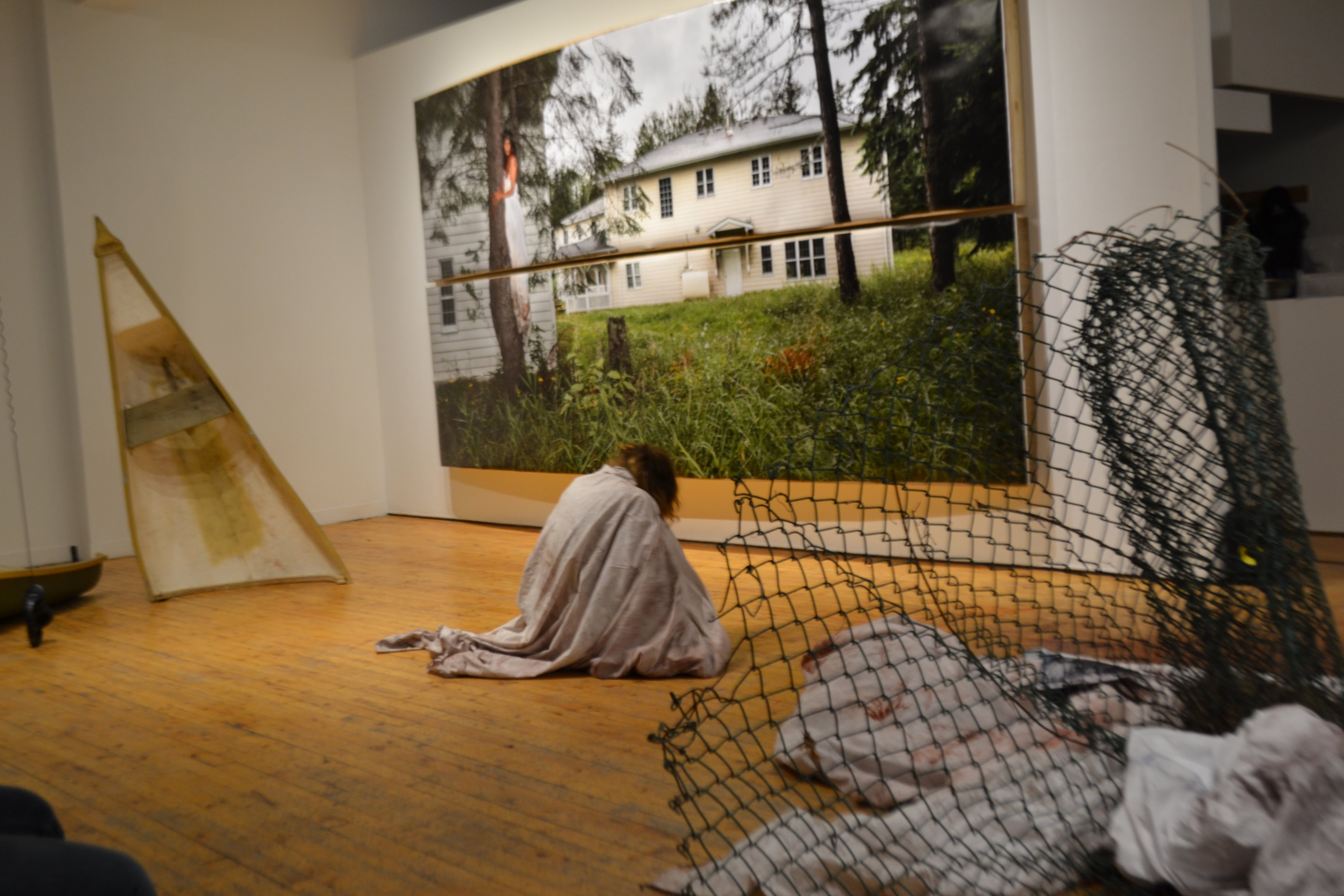
Lara Kramer's performance of "Phantom, stills, and vibrations"

In 2004, the "Pelican Residential School Monument and Memorial Garden" was opened. The monument was funded by both the Aboriginal Healing Fund, and the Department of Indian and Northern Affairs Canada. The opening took place at the Pelican Residential School Monument and Memorial Garden Opening and Healing Conference. The conference was a three-day event that included many events such as: keynote addresses, workshops, and a pow wow.

Artists such as Lara Kramer have drawn upon their families' experience at Pelican Lake Residential School as inspiration for public works of art. Kramer's performance installation, "Phantom, stills and vibrations" was shown at Artspace in Peterborough in March 2018. The performance installation used still images from Pelican Lake Residential School, objects that evoked memories of the school and memorialized the children who attended the school, audio of her family's experiences and of sounds of the land, and included a dance performance.
