= Ahousaht Indian Residential School =

Defunct Canadian residential school

- Ahousaht, British Columbia

Information
- Religious affiliations: Presbyterian Church in Canada, United Church of Canada
- Established: 1904; 122 years ago
- Closed: 1940; 86 years ago

The Ahousaht Indian Residential School was a school within the Canadian Indian residential school system that operated in Ahousaht, British Columbia from 1904 to 1940. The school was located on Flores Island south of the Marktosis Indian Reserve #15, on land owned by the Women's Missionary Society.

The Ahousaht Indian Residential School began as a day school run by the Presbyterian Church of Canada that opened in 1895. In 1904 the federal government funded a transition to a residential facility under the supervision of Reverend J.C. Butchart. In June 1904, prior to the start of the residential school year, five Ahousaht chiefs - Chief Billy, old Chief Moquiney, Chief Benson, Chief Atlin, and Chief Nokamas - petitioned the government with concerns about the school. They protested the actions of the Presbyterian Church, including missionary John Russell, whom they accused of keeping children at the school against the wishes of their parents. The Board of Home Missions of the United Church of Canada took over operation of the school in 1925.

The original school was a three-storey building with accommodations for 50 students. The school burned down in 1916 and a day school program offered classes until a new building with capacity for 25 students was built. Male students helped rebuild, as part of their vocational training. The school again burned down on January 26, 1940. Indian Affairs official P.B. Ashbridge reported that faulty wiring caused the fire. Multiple prior inspection reports had said the facility was at risk. A 1937 report called the building a "fire trap". Inspector G. H Barry concluded in 1939 that school was a "fire hazard", stating that low water pressure on the ground would make it impossible to fight a fire if one broke out.

The school was never rebuilt. The Truth and Reconciliation Commission of Canada stated that the fire at Ahousaht, as well as those at other schools, played a role in ending the residential school system, as they presented an opportunity to expand the prevalence of day schools.

The majority of the students came from Ahousaht First Nation but United Church of Canada records show that occasionally children from Nuu-chah-nulth communities also attended. In February 1938, 14-year-old Clifford Tate lost his left arm in the school's laundry room. Thirteen students are known to have died at the school. Among them was William Maquina, son of Ahousat Chief Billy. Community leaders demanded to have staff at the school replaced. The number of known deaths does not include students who attended the school but died off-site; sick children were often sent home. In his 1911 submission for the Annual Report of the Department of Indian Affairs, principal John T. Ross reported that six former students had died from tuberculosis.

In June 2021, Ahousaht Indian Residential School was included in a GoFundMe campaign launched by Victoria-based Indigenous leaders to fund a search of the grounds of Vancouver Island residential schools. As of March 2021 the grounds were being used by Ahousaht First Nation to build a wellness centre.

== See also ==
- List of Canadian Indian residential schools
