= St. Philip's Indian Residential School =

Residential School in Chisasibi Quebec

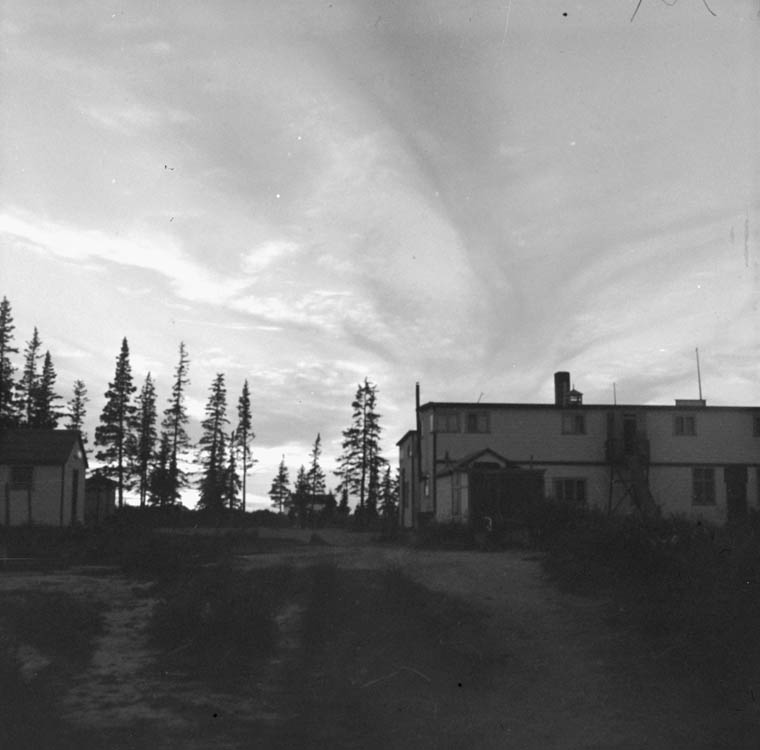
- Anglican Indian Residential School, Fort George, Quebec, 1948
- Chisasibi, Quebec; Canada

Information
- Type: Canadian Indian Residential School
- Religious affiliation: Anglican
- Established: 1 September 1932
- Closed: 30 June 1975
- Principal: Trevor Jones (1932–37), Father Paul Bousquet (?)
- Enrollment: 160 (peak authorized enrolment)

The St. Phillip's Indian Residential School was a part of the Canadian Indian Residential School System. Located in Fort George (present day Chisasibi), Quebec, it was one of the first residential schools located in Quebec along with the Fort George Residential School established in the same community and operated by the Roman Catholic Church. Until 1940 they were the only two operational residential schools in the province. The school was established in 1932 and remained in operation until 1975 except for a brief period during which it was being rebuilt after a fire.

Documentation of the school and its activities are sparse, leading to a history with both gaps and contradictions as well as an incomplete register of the students who died while attending the school. The building no longer stands in the community where it was built.

== History ==
=== Administration ===
St. Philip's Indian Residential School is an Anglican institution which operated from 1933 to 1975. Before St. Philip's residential school was established, there was a day school in Fort George, which the Anglican Church requested be converted into a residential school in 1922. This request was denied because officials believed Fort George was located in Ontario rather than in Quebec. The timeline then shifts: the school transitioned into a residential school in 1932, and government funding followed in 1934.

The Anglican Church of Canada managed the residential school from 1932 to 1936. On January 1, 1936, the School Board of Indian and Eskimo Residential Schools of the Missionary Society of the Church of England in Canada took over administration. From 1961 to 1969, the Diocese of Moosonee of the Anglican Church was responsible for operating the school.

A further transition occurred when the Government of Canada took over the school's operations on April 1, 1969, until the school closed in June 1975. Around this time, the federal government introduced the policy of separated residence from classrooms and the residences became known as St. Philip's Student Residence, while the classrooms became part of a federal day school. The principal of the federal day school reported directly to the government superintendent. Although the government took control, the church remained involved by offering religious and spiritual support.

=== History of the building and grounds ===
==== 1933–43, the early years ====
When the school first opened in 1933, the main building only contained two classrooms. By 1938, the school expanded its resources to include four cows and established a small garden, later increasing its cultivation area to 2 acres in 1943.

In response to sickness affecting the school, in 1941, the Missionary Society of the Church of England in Canada provided a small hospital with 9 beds inside the school building.

==== 1943 fire and rebuilding ====
A significant timeline event occurred on January 26, 1943: the St. Philips residential school caught fire, destroying the main building. Fires were a recurring risk, as residential schools were commonly poorly built and maintained, creating fire hazards. In the aftermath of the fire, the school used the Anglican Church's Parish Hall as a temporary day school.

The missionary Society of the Church of England in Canada rebuilt the school because the federal government was not building any new residential schools during World War II. The school finished reconstruction as a two-story building in 1944. The first floor included two classrooms, a recreation room, a dining area, a kitchen, and the principal's office, while the second floor housed six dormitory rooms. However, despite the school's needing to be rebuilt, serious fire safety was still a concern, as it was still in poor condition, as an official named W.J. Harvey in 1957, stated that the only fire protection the school contained was fire extinguishers filled with water.

==== 1953–75, the later years ====
Due to overcrowding, classrooms were set up in the Parish Hall and the boys' playroom in the 1950s. In 1953, the Church of England in Canada purchased 7.64 acres of land, and the same year, the government authorized the purchase. In the following years, the school began to expand. In 1960, a new classroom building and a house for the principal were built, and in 1963, a new dormitory and more classrooms were added. The classroom was renamed Sand Park Federal School in 1972. The school was shut down for a time in 1974 because of serious fire safety concerns, and it permanently closed in 1975.

==== Enrolment history ====
Information on the student population within the school comes from limited resources, and the available documents provide only partial details on where students originated and which communities they come from. The population spans a wide geographic area, as the school's student body includes students from reserves such as Paint Hill, Old Factory, Eastmain, Rupert House, Fort George, Nemaska, and Grande Baleine River

The available sources indicate that the student body included at least Cree and Inuit students. However, despite the gap in the historical record regarding student origin, more detailed information exists on the school's authorized capacity and the actual number of enrolled students over the course of the school's operation, except for a few years for which data are lacking.

== Funding ==
Primary funding for the school was provided by the Government of Canada, and administered by the Anglican Church before being transferred to the School Board of Indian and Eskimo Residential Schools of the Missionary Society of the Church of England in Canada.

The school gained its charter during a period of steady decline in the amount of funding allocated to residential schools for each student in their charge.

The government provided enough resources for the school to house 35 students from 1933 to 1937. In 1933/34, the school maintained the authorized student enrolment of 32 students. However, in the following years, the school enrolled more students than it was funded for. From 1938 to 1947, the government's funding for the school increased to 50 students. Actual enrolment continued to exceed these allocations. Records show that in 1937/38 the school had 53 students and in 1938/39, 62 students.

Some reports describe the school as being opened in 1947 with funding from the Indian Affairs branch of the Department of Citizenship and Immigration (Canada), although this is possibly contradicted by other reported histories.

== Criticisms ==
=== Healthcare and diet ===
The Truth and Reconciliation Commission of Canada (TRC) documents that the health and nutritional conditions at the Fort George Anglican Residential School in northern Quebec reflected many of the systemic problems that characterized the broader Canadian residential school system.

For example, medical care at the school was limited and often poorly coordinated between federal departments responsible for Indigenous affairs and health services. "Administrative conflicts between government agencies sometimes resulted in basic health supplies not being consistently provided. For example, officials debated which department was responsible for supplying items such as dental hygiene products, leaving students without proper dental care for extended periods". Consequently, these bureaucratic failures illustrate the broader neglect that shaped health services within the residential school system, where children's medical needs were frequently secondary to budgetary concerns and institutional priorities. These conditions negatively affected the health and living conditions of Indigenous students at Fort George Anglican Residential School like many others. "An unnamed federal health official wrote in 1962 that there had been a steady stream of illness at the Anglican school in Fort George, Québec, over the previous five years. He attributed the problem to poor management". Eventually, insignificant organization, insufficient budget, systematic neglect and ignorance created the perfect environment for spread of diseases, continuation of illness among students and miserable quality of life.

=== Deaths ===
The record of deaths in the residential school system is incomplete, and this has helped fuel widespread Residential school denialism by creating a false sense of legitimacy.

The history of the Fort George Anglican Residential School, which operated in Fort George, Quebec from 1933 to 1975, is part of the broader system of residential schools established to assimilate Indigenous children in Canada. Administered by the Anglican Church, the school removed children from their families, communities, and cultures, often exposing them to harsh conditions, neglect, and abuse. Some students never returned home. According to records from the National Centre for Truth and Reconciliation, among those who died while attending or as a result of their time at the school were the students in the list below. Remembering these children is an essential act of acknowledgment and contributes to ongoing efforts toward truth, justice, and reconciliation.

Deaths at St. Phillip's Residential School
Name	Date of Death
Allen Napo or Mayopo	1938-12-25
Eliza Sealhunter	1939-05-14
Beatrice Moses	1940-02-08
Clifford John Bearskin	1940-02-29
Sydney Checkochee	1940-03-19
Juliet Chekachie	1940-04-04
David Walter Utchenayea	1940-06-02
Samson Nine Oclock	1940-06-19
Sinclair Pestawayan	1940-07-02
Daniel Bertie Fireman	1940-07-31
Samuel Sealhunter	1940-08-15
Daniel Napash	1940-08-23
Carl Wymes Linkeleter	1940-08-26
Agnes Edna Rednose	1940-11-05
Joshua Ckeeskomash	1941-04-02
David Harry Snowboy	1941-05-26
Stephane Fiseman	1941-06-06
Mary Kumapawesit	1941-08-18
John Kunawteewat	ca. 1941
Harriet Mistacheshuk	1942-05-31
Harriet Jessie Sealhunter	1942-06-26
Rebekah Agnes Sealhunter	1942-06-27
Anne Lameboy	1943-03-23
Maggie Sashawaskum	1945-05-03
Bertie Kitty	1946-01-23
Ellen Bobbish	1951-02-07
Jimmy Pashagameshkum	1965-03-08
George Kitchen	Not known
