= Prince Albert Indian Residential School =

Coordinates: 53°11′33″N 105°46′42″W

Location of Prince Albert Residential School in Saskatchewan

Prince Albert Indian Residential School was a Canadian residential school operated by the Anglican Church for First Nations children in Prince Albert, Saskatchewan. It was located on the West Hill of Prince Albert in a former army barracks.

Victoria Union Hospital is now adjacent to the former school area to the west. The school grounds are now part of the Peter Ballantyne Cree Nation urban reserve.

The school was formed in 1951 through the amalgamation of St. Albans Indian Residential School and the All Saints Indian Residential School. Prince Albert Indian Residential School was operated by the Missionary Society of the Church of England in Canada (MSCC) until 1996.

== History ==
St. Albans Indian Residential School operated from 1944 to 1951 when it was amalgamated with All Saints to become Prince Albert Indian Residential School. St. Albans replaced the St. Barnabas Indian Residential School at Onion Lake which opened in 1893 and the 1922 building was destroyed by fire in 1943.

All Saints Indian Residential School operated from 1948 until 1951 when it was amalgamated with St. Albans to become Prince Albert Indian Residential School. All Saints was previously located in La Ronge, Saskatchewan, from 1906 to 1947. Its staff and students were moved to Prince Albert when the school was destroyed by fire in 1947.

After the amalgamation in 1951 the student population increased from about 165 to 485. Students were from Manitoba and Saskatchewan.

"P.A.I.S. was and is still the only one of its kind in Canada; i.e., it is not one large building like all the other Indian schools. It is located in the old army camp, the original site of the North-West Mounted Police, on a hill at the very edge of the city of Prince Albert and consisted of twelve H-shaped army huts, a drill hall, a Principal's Residence, a laundry, in which all the school's laundry requirements were done; there was a kitchen and off each side a dining room, one side for boys and the other for the girls." (James Roberts 1971)

== See also ==
- Canadian Indian residential school system
- List of residential schools in Canada
