= Diocese of Moosonee =

Diocese of Moosonee can refer to the following Canadian entities:

- Anglican Diocese of Moosonee
- Roman Catholic Diocese of Moosonee, defunct
- Roman Catholic Diocese of Hearst–Moosonee, current
