= Pelican Falls First Nations High School =

Private school in Ontario, Canada

Location
- 72-650 Pelican Falls Road; Kenora District; Sioux Lookout, Ontario; Canada
- 50°7′15″N 92°0′39″W

Information
- Type: Private
- School board: Northern Nishnawbe Education Council
- Principal: Darren Head
- Age range: 13-19
- Language: English
- Sports: Volleyball, basketball, curling, badminton
- Mascot: Wolf
- Website: https://www.nnec.on.ca/pelican-falls-first-nations-high-school

Pelican Falls First Nations High School (PFFNHS, PFC or Pelican) is a private high school operated and controlled by First Nations peoples. The school grounds are located approximately 7.2km West-Northwest of Sioux Lookout on the shore of Pelican Lake. The school is owned and operated by the Northern Nishnawbe Education Council.
