= Cross Lake Roman Catholic Residential Boarding School =

Cross Lake Residential School was a Canadian Indian residential school located on Nelson River in Manitoba. The school operated for 54 years between 1912 and 1969. Cross Lake was the main residential school for the province of Manitoba. Between 1930 and 1960, the government was fully funding two separate schools, the Norway House and Cross Lake. Cross Lake Residential School was also known by nine other names consisting of; Jack River Annex, Norway House Roman Catholic, St. Joseph's Indian Residential School, Norway House Boarding School, Cross Lake Residential School, Cross Lake Roman Catholic Residential School, Cross Lake Indian Industrial School, Cross Lake Roman Catholic Boarding School and St, Joseph's Indian Boarding School. "The school's objective was to 'civilize' Indigenous children, a process that involved strict English-only policies, Christianization efforts, and a curriculum that largely ignored or denigrated Indigenous cultures and knowledge."

== History ==
Among 24 different communities, 1,240 Indigenous children were made to attend Cross Lake Residential School. Cross Lake Residential School was administrated on the land of the Pimicikamak Cree Nation. Throughout the years of operation, 85 students' deaths were documented. Cross Lake's community went into a state of identity crisis due to the amount of suicides as a result of intergenerational trauma.

=== 1930 fire ===
On February 25, 1930 a fire broke out in the residential school. The school's water system failed during this time and exposed the unsafe conditions that were evident in so many residential schools. This incident caused 13 people to die in the fire; 11 girls, 1 boy and 1 staff member. The poorly designed housings only gave the girls one fire escape, compared to the boy's dormitory where there were two. This fire reinforced deeper-rooted problems within the residential school system, as it brought to light the "poor infrastructure, inadequate funding, and blatant disregard for the well-being of Indigenous children. The school was not rebuilt until 1940. Students who attended the school and survived the fire spent the next 10 years at different hostels affiliated with local Catholic day schools.

After the fire in 1930, two boys named George Payne, 17, and Nelson Hughes, 18, were convicted of starting the fire at Cross Lake. Between the 10 years of the school not being rebuilt, many petitions were sent in hopes to have the school reconstructed. There were two petitions sent within the 10 years of the school not being rebuilt.

The children who passed away during the fire were placed together in a single coffin and were buried at the Cross Lake Roman Catholic Cemetery on March 4th, 1930.

Evidence produced in court proved that the fire that the two boys set at Cross Lake Residential School led to a mass homicide that took 13 lives in total.

The assistant fire commissioner reported a month later on March 8th, 1930 that the nuns' effort to save the children "were little short of miraculous"

=== Governmental and operational roles ===
Cross Lake was funded by the Canadian government. The school was run by many different Christian religious groups including the Missionary Oblates of Mary Immaculate via the Roman Catholic Diocese being the prominent one. The administration was dealt with by the Roman Catholic Church.

In 1962, the management at Cross Lake was transferred to the Indian and Eskimo Welfare Commission and it stayed that way until the residential school closed in 1969.

== Student experience ==
=== Education ===
Cross Lake Residential School offered mostly elementary grades for the majority of the time that the school was up and running. Towards the late 1930s and 1950s, grade 7 and 8 were offered, as well as kindergarten in the early 1960s. Within the final years of the residential school being open, all grades up to grade 6 were being taught and in the last year it was only grades 1 through 4.

The fire affected the amount of students who attended the residential school for a decade but in the late 1950s, the school obtained its highest student population with 149 students attending.

=== Two different residences ===
With Norway House and Cross Lake both being located in Manitoba, students were transferred between the residential schools. The two residential schools were funded by the Cross Lake Residential School per capita grant and this allowed the schools to have a large student population. Students who lived at the Norway House, which was also referred to as the "Jack River Branch" or the "Jack River Annex" were still enrolled at Cross Lake, yet would go to school there.

During the 10 years of limbo between the two different schools, the students at both locations were supported under the government funded grant. However, in March it only allowed under 10 students to permanently board there and it was not until September 1933 that the grant allowed for 30 students to stay in both Cross Lake and Norway House. The amount of students allowed at both operating schools remained 30 until August 1938.

=== Student health conditions ===
After Cross Lake Residential School was rebuilt in 1940 following a fire, students who returned to the new facility developed severe health issues, and deaths occurred shortly after.

Tuberculosis occurred in 1943 due to overcrowding at St. Joseph's Residential School as stated in the reports held at the National Centre for Truth and Reconciliation.

== Closure ==
The school permanently closed in 1969 and the responsibility for the school shifted to the provincial education system.

A second fire in 1969, led to the building being destroyed.

While the school had multiple names during its 57 years of operations, in the final year of its operation the school renamed itself Cross Lake Student Residence and that was the final name before the school closed on June 30, 1969.

== Legacy and reconciliation ==
The Cross Lake band has aimed to create a lasting monument to commemorate the students who attended Cross Lake Residential School. This attempt began to foster reconciliation as even though Pope Francis did make an apology to the Nation, in regards to the survivors of the Residential Schools, he did not shed light on the students who did not make it back to their families.

In 2021, Cross Lake Community obtained 2.1 million dollars for research that was funded by the federal government. The money was given for "archival research, statement gathering, commemoration and fieldwork investigation" in aims to help communities with their research to hopefully begin to discover and document the children who never made it home.

The issues that they are having with the search that they are trying to conduct is that new homes have been built on the land where the school once stood.

The legacy of residential schools has had lasting impacts on families across Manitoba, with the loss of children and the enduring trauma that is still present.

=== What are Residential School Survivors doing now? ===
Residential school survivor Elder Betty Ross from the Pimicikamak Cree Nation explains how she is a survivor of two separate residential school experiences, as she attended Cross Lake along with another school. Betty Ross has shared her residential school experiences through two books. In 2008, she was working as a Cree interpreter, until she went to work as a Spiritual Cultural Care Provider for Indigenous Health Initiatives for the Winnipeg Regional Health Authority. Betty then retired in 2018. Currently, she is working with different schools focusing on Indigenous Cultural Initiatives for all elementary levels.

Elder Betty Ross believes that Truth must come before Reconciliation. It is essential for the city of Winnipeg to accept and utilize the truth that lies Indigenous history in order to overcome long standing hurtles that have been put in place as a result of colonialism.

== Discovery of unmarked graves ==
The chief of the Pimicikamak Cree Nation David Monais, insists that closure needs to be given to communities whose families lost lives. Leaders in Pimicikamak have called upon the federal government to assist them in searching for potential burial sites located at the residential school.

A community in Manitoba "found 150 anomalies at the site of a former residential school, including what are believed to be 59 unmarked graves at a nearby cemetery"

It has been said by the Chief of the Pimicikamak Cree Nation David Monais that "the community is aware of one mass grave for children who died in one of the fires in 1930"

While the community of Cross Lake is attempting to bring attention to the forgotten children, it has been difficult to identify how many students existed, as names were not accurately documented in existing records.
