= Assumption (Hay Lakes) Indian Residential School =

Coordinates: 58.7021°N 118.6865°W

Assumption Indian Residential School (also called the Hay Lakes Residential School) was a part of the Canadian Indian Residential School System in Northwestern Alberta, Canada. The school was operated on the south end of the Hay Lakes reserve by the United Church of Canada and the Roman Catholic Church between 1951 and 1974.

== History ==
Assumption School was established in 1951. Missionary Oblates and the Sisters of Providence taught and worked at the school. The Assumption (Hay Lakes) Indian Residential School was located north of High Level in Alberta and in the Peace River Territory. The residential school was northwest of Edmonton and down south of Hay Lakes. The Assumption Residential School was open for 23 years. The administration of the Hay Lakes Residential School issued papers stating that they would open up the school on September 1, 1950. However, opened at a later time.

Following the opening of a day school in the nearby community of Habay in 1962, the Assumption school increasingly served as a residence for students attending the day school. In 1965, Assumption began offering adult education classes to help Indigenous people get the most out of what little they have. Assumption received several "benefits" for allowing the oil industry to use its airstrip, land, roads, bridge and mobile phone.

The institution served as a boarding or residential school from 1951 until 1968 when converted to a day school. In 1969, the Department of Indian Affairs took control of the residential schools in Canada. In 1971, the Sisters of Providence quit the Assumption (Hay Lakes) Indian Residential School. Assumption (Hay Lakes) Residential School and day school were later shut down in 1974.

The children who were forced to attend Assumption were mostly members of the Dene Tha’ First Nation. They were forced to follow the Catholic Church and the United Church of Canada’s indoctrination.The education at the Assumption Indian Residential School was stated to be harsh and improper at times according to a report in 1970. It is currently unknown how many students were forced to attend Assumption Indian Residential School. Although, there is not an exact number of how many students attended the Assumption Hay Lakes Indian Residential School, there were approximately over 150,000 children that were forced to attend.

== Health care ==
Newspapers reported in June 1960 that a doctor, nurse, X-ray technician and the head of Indian Affairs was traveling to various Indigenous bands and residential schools to X-ray them, looking for tuberculosis.

== Student deaths ==
Two students at Assumption (Hay Lakes) Indian Residential School died: Lucie Semantha died on June 19, 1952 and Carmen Chonkolay died on December 19, 1968. The causes of their deaths is currently unknown.
