= Mount Elgin Indian Residential School =

Indian Residential School in Muncey, Ontario, Canada (1851-1946)

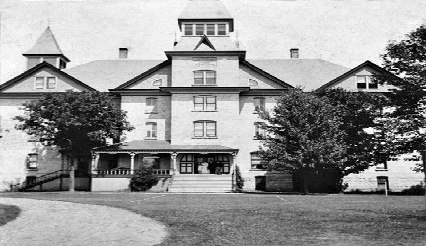
- Mount Elgin Residential School (1910)
- Muncey, Ontario

Information
- Religious affiliations: Methodist, United Church of Canada
- Established: 1851
- Closed: 30 June 1946
- Principal: see § Principals

The Mount Elgin Indian Residential School, also known as the Muncey Institute, was a Canadian Indian Residential School which operated from 1851 to 1946 and then briefly after 1967 in Muncey, Ontario.

== History ==
The Mount Elgin School was established in 1847, on the land which is now occupied by the Chippewas of the Thames First Nation. The cornerstone of the school building was laid on July 17, 1849 and it opened to students in 1851. The school was operated by the Wesleyan Methodist Society and the Department of Indian Affairs. When the school first opened it stood on 200 acres procured from the Chippewas of the Thames for the purpose of the school. The School initially opened to 13 boarders and a number of day scholars, but by 1911 that number had increased to 102. From the 1930s onward the school averaged approximately 1950 students a year. Students came to the school from over 18 Indigenous communities in Ontario and Quebec.

In 1925 management of the school transferred to the United Church of Canada's Home Board of Missions. The Mount Elgin School was the only residential school operated by the United Church in Ontario. Numerous additions were added to the school over the years. In 1942, a government inspection of the school found that the school buildings were in a bad state of disrepair. By 1944 the school included the main building, the classroom/annex building, a laundry, and a manual training building; the school also had numerous barns and farm buildings.

The school closed on June 30, 1946 but was reopened in 1967 [source needed].

In 2012, the only remaining building from Mount Elgin still standing was an abandoned barn. The walls of the barn include names carved into the wood by students during their time working on the farm at Mount Elgin.

== Student experience ==
The experience of students at the Mount Elgin residential school was similar to the experience of Indigenous children who attended residential schools across Canada. Students have spoken about the poor medical treatment and care provided to them while at Mount Elgin. In 1908, students at Mount Elgin set fire to the school three times. Other students have spoken about the poor quality of food at the residential school and the lack of meat in their diet, despite the fact that the school's farm included numerous animals. Additionally, students have discussed the hard labor they were forced to undertake on the school's farm and the physical abuse many of them endured while at the school.

The National Centre for Truth and Reconciliation's National Student Memorial Register lists five students who are known to have died at this Residential School, including: Courtland Claud, Evangeline Jackson, Helen May Seneca, McGahey, and Simon Altman.

== Principals ==
The following individuals served as principals and school administrators during the operation of the Mount Elgin School:

| Principal Name | Years |
|---|---|
| Rev. Samuel Rose | 1859 |
| R.E. Tupper | 1868-1870 |
| Rev. James Gray | 1871-1872 |
| Ephraim Evans, D.D. | 1873-1874 |
| Thomas Cosford | 1875 - June 1881 |
| Rev. William W. Shepherd | July 1881 - May 1903 |
| R.G. Howes (Vice Principal) | August 1902 - May 1903 |
| Rev. T.T. George | July 1903 - June 1909 |
| Rev. S.R. McVitty | June 1909 - 1934 |
| Rev. C.W. McKenzie (Assistant Principal) | 1927 |
| Rev. Oliver B. Strapp | 1929-1933 (Assistant Principal), 1934 (Acting Principal), 1934-1944 (Principal) |
| Rev. S.H. Soper | June 1944 - June 1946 |

== Commemoration ==
In the early 2000s, residential school survivors from Chippewas of the Thames who attended Mount Elgin created a video entitled "Our Healing Journey" which documented their experience at the residential school. This video was part of the early healing programming undertaken by the local community.

In June 2012, a commemorative marker was installed by the Chippewas of the Thames First Nation on the site of the original residential school building. The marker has seven pillars, representing the seven grandfather teachings. It includes the names of students who attended the school. Approximately 1,000 people were present at the unveiling of the monument.
