= Norway House Residential School =

Information
- Other names: Norway House United Church Norway House Boarding School Norway House United Church Indian Residential School
- Established: 1900
- Closed: 1967

Norway House Residential School was a residential school that operated from 1900 until 1967 near Little Playgreen Lake. The school occupied around 40 acres of Norway House Cree Nation in Manitoba and was operated by the Methodist Church of Canada until 1925, when it was handed over to the United Church of Canada.

Operations of the residential school stopped on May 29, 1946, when it was destroyed by a fire. It was rebuilt and operations resumed in September 1954.

== History ==
In 1840, a mission was established at Norway House by Rev. James Evans of the Methodist Church. The area was originally occupied by the Swampy Cree. At the time of Evans' arrival, many Swampy Cree families began working for the Hudson's Bay Company, which had a post located across the bay from the Norway House settlement.

Soon after Evans' established his mission, he founded a day school with intent to teach children English as well as Cree syllabics. In 1898, the Methodist Church requested funds from the Department of Indian Affairs to build the school. The Norway House Residential School opened in 1900 with 56 boarded students in its first year. Vocational training at the school included chopping wood, vegetable gardening, water retrieval from the lake, and baking for the boys, and sewing, ironing, dressmaking, baking, and washing for the girls.

On February 26, 1913, a fire started by a wood-burning stove burned the residential school down. A new building designed to house 80 students opened on October 15, 1915. Classes resumed within the community while the new building was constructed.

On May 29, 1946, the school was burned down for the second time. Instruction was halted and students were housed within Norway House until they could return to their original communities. The school was once again rebuilt, this time with capacity for 120 students across two separate dormitories.

Many instances of abuse were recorded at Norway House Residential School. Records state that some students were punished in such a manner that left them permanently disabled. Several children at the residential school died from outbreaks of tuberculosis. There were also outbreaks of whooping cough, bronchitis, pneumonia, and chickenpox.

In 2022, in response to the 215 unmarked graves found at Kamloops Indian Residential School, the Norway House Cree Nation began its investigating the Norway House Residential School for unmarked graves.
