= Grey Sisters of the Immaculate Conception =

Roman Catholic congregation in Canada

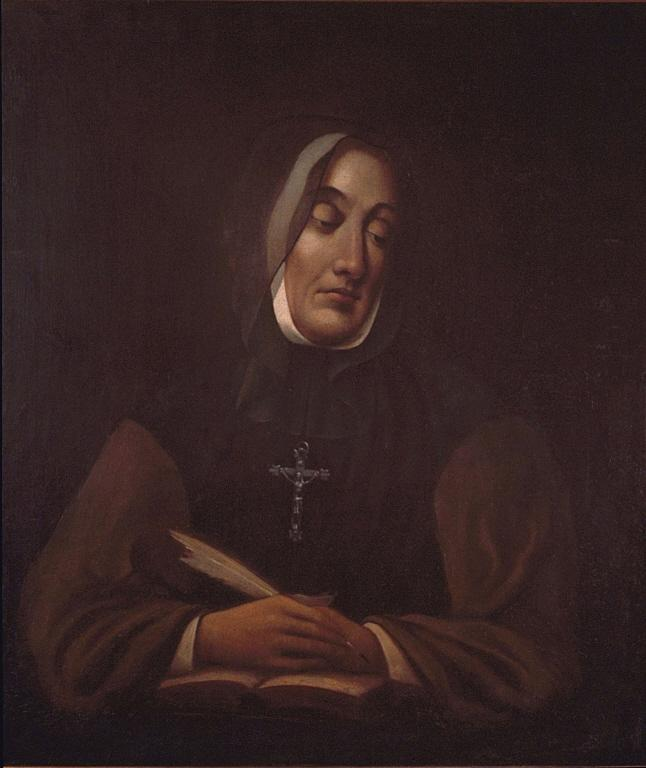
- Saint Marguerite d'Youville (Painting by James Duncan, 1825–1881)
- Formation: 1926
- Type: Religious organizations
- Legal status: active
- Headquarters: Pembroke, Ontario
- Location: Pembroke, Ontario
- Region served: Canada, China, Dominican Republic, Japan, Bahamas, Ireland, Thailand
- Website: Home Page

The Grey Sisters of the Immaculate Conception is a congregation of Roman Catholic sisters founded in 1926 in Pembroke, Ontario, Canada. It is dedicated to following the tradition of St. Marie-Marguerite d'Youville, and has established a number of international ministries that offer services in the areas of health, education, pastoral care, and social and environmental advocacy.

The first international ministry established by the Grey Sisters was founded in China in 1929, working closely with the Canadian missionaries of the Scarboro Foreign Mission Society. In 1951, ministries were established in Japan and the Dominican Republic. In 1960, they founded a ministry in the Bahamas, and most recently in Ireland and Thailand in 1998.

== See also ==
- Grey Nuns
