= Pine Creek Residential School =

Residential school in Manitoba, Canada

Location of Camperville, Manitoba

The Pine Creek Residential School (also known as Camperville Indian Residential School) operated from 1890 to 1969 and was situated in Camperville, Manitoba, Canada. The community lies along Lake Winnipegosis and is largely inhabited by Métis residents. It was part of the Canadian residential school system, which was funded by the federal government and primarily operated by Christian churches and religious organizations. The school was operated by the Missionary Oblates of Mary Immaculate alongside various groups of Catholic nuns.

The school was attended by Indigenous children from surrounding communities, including Anishinaabe and Métis students. As with other residential schools in Canada, the system aimed to assimilate Indigenous children into Western society by suppressing their traditional ways of life.

The residential school system has been associated with lasting impacts, including the loss of Indigenous languages, cultural practices, and knowledge.

== History ==
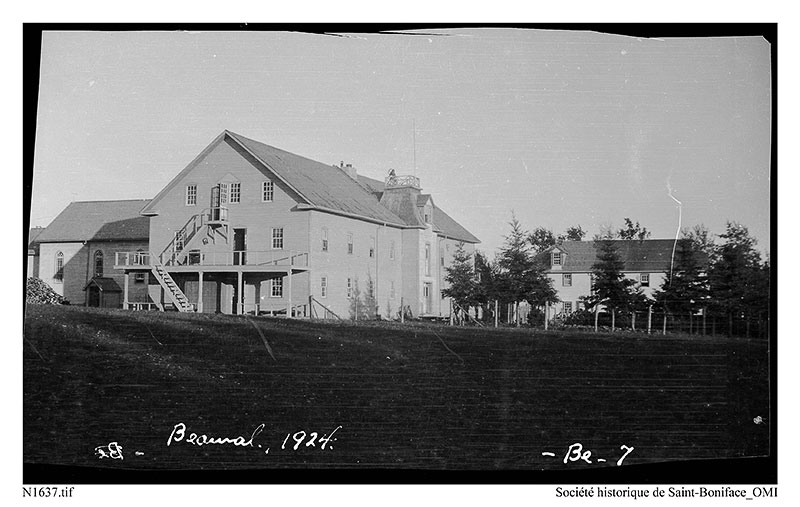
Exterior view of Beauval Residential School building, 1924

Prior to the establishment of Pine Creek Residential School, Oblate missionaries were already active in the Camperville region for several years before 1886, when they created a permanent presence in the Pine Creek area and founded a local parish. The school was established in Camperville circa 1890. It was intended to bring together Indigenous children from surrounding communities as part of broader government efforts to centralize populations and promote assimilation within the residential school system.

A small boarding school opened in 1897 and initially accommodated roughly ten students. However, the building soon became inadequate and was in poor condition. Father Adelard Chaumont of the Missionary Oblates of Mary Immaculate (O.M.I.) and Bishop Langevin later persuaded the Canadian government to support the construction of a larger residential school in the community. A four-storey stone school building was completed in 1899 and soon became the central focus of the mission. The building was constructed using local stone by Scottish stone workers from the Red River region and was considered one of the first substantial buildings northwest of Dauphin. In its early years, the structure also functioned as a place of worship, which contained a chapel. This remained the case until a larger stone church of similar design was constructed in the area between 1906 and 1910.

The school enrolled many Métis and Anishinaabe (Ojibwe/Saulteaux) students. The federal government funded the institution and provided financial support based on student attendance. Enrollment increased over time, rising to about forty students before reaching approximately seventy by 1901. In 1925, the Roman Catholic mission sold the building to the Department of Indian Affairs after it was no longer able to finance the school. In later years, the institution was replaced by a new facility where students attended as day students rather than residing at the school. During the 1960s, the Canadian government began closing residential schools to transition Indigenous children into the broader public education system. This led to the school's closure in 1969 and its demolition in 1972. Following its demolition, materials from the building were repurposed to create a causeway in Pine Creek, while portions of the original foundation remain at the site.

== Operation ==
The Franciscan Missionaries of Mary were the first group of nuns to work alongside the Oblates in their mission. Later in 1922, the Benedictine Sisters replaced the Franciscan Missionaries of Mary. In 1928, the Missionary Oblate Sisters of the Sacred Heart and of Mary Immaculate succeeded the Benedictine Sisters and remained in Camperville until the school’s closure. The nuns were responsible for the care of the girls and carried out various duties within the school, including teaching, kitchen work, gardening, and managing the dairy. Students in higher grade levels received academic instruction for part of the day, while the remainder of their time was devoted to home economics and agricultural work. Academic instruction was primarily provided to older students, while younger children were more frequently assigned to labour, resulting in unequal access to formal education. Vegetable gardens and grain crops were developed to support the school's cattle herd. Students were involved in food production and contributed to the maintenance and operation of the school. Boys and girls were taught different hands-on skills and trades. Boys were trained in activities such as agriculture, carpentry, shoe repair, and painting, while girls were taught domestic tasks including cooking, budgeting, weaving, carding, and caring for livestock. Gardening was one activity shared by both groups.

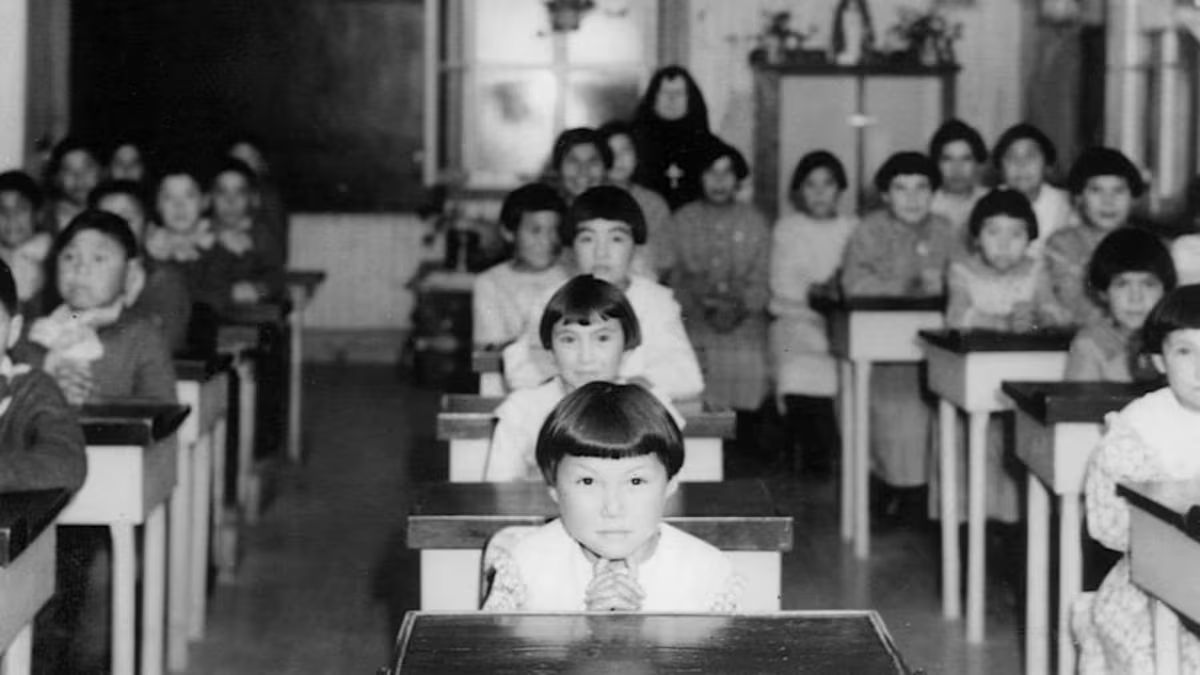
Students in a residential school classroom, Quebec, 1939

The daily life of Indigenous children at Pine Creek Residential School was highly structured and organized around a division between labour and formal education, which shaped their routine. Students followed a daily routine that began early in the morning. At approximately 6:00, they woke up, followed by mass in the chapel at 6:30. The period before breakfast was typically reserved for chores, such as preparing tables or cleaning the dormitory and the priests' rooms. Following morning chores, students ate breakfast at 7:30, then spent time outdoors and began classes at 9:00. Practical skills and vocational training were typically taught in the morning, while afternoon instruction followed the midday break and began with catechism. Academic courses were generally provided to older students, whereas younger children were assigned to labour. Classes concluded at 4:00, followed by an extended recess, after which students resumed manual labour. In the evening, students had another period of free time, followed by a scheduled study session before going to bed. As a result, academic instruction was limited in comparison to labour, which occupied a significant portion of the daily schedule.

== Impact and legacy ==
The residential school system, which was imposed on Indigenous peoples as part of broader colonial policies, sought to assimilate them by suppressing their cultural identities and histories. Approximately 150,000 First Nations, Inuit, and Métis children attended residential schools in Canada during the late 19th and 20th centuries. The impact of these experiences extended beyond survivors themselves, affecting their families and communities over time. It aimed to integrate Indigenous children into Christian society by separating them from their cultural practices and encouraging their conversion to Christianity. These practices reflected underlying beliefs rooted in racial, cultural, and spiritual superiority. While the residential school system was in operation, Indigenous children were forcibly separated from their families and subjected to mistreatment. They were removed from their cultural communities and restricted from using their mother tongues and practicing their traditional knowledge. Many experienced neglect, including malnutrition and starvation, as well as inadequate healthcare. In addition to neglect, they were often exposed to harsh discipline that resulted in emotional, physical, and sexual abuse. The consequences of the residential school system extended beyond abuse, as many children never returned home to their families. Thousands died while attending these institutions, and the burial sites of numerous children remain unknown.

The residential school system has been associated with lasting intergenerational effects within Indigenous populations, including reduced educational and social outcomes, increased levels of violence, and strained relationships between parents and children. These institutions eroded fundamental elements of Indigenous cultures by isolating children from their traditional ways of life, languages, and family systems, weakening their connections to the land. The Truth and Reconciliation Commission of Canada described the residential school system as a form of cultural genocide.

Indigenous peoples resisted the residential school system in various ways throughout its history. This included protesting mistreatment and inadequate schooling, as well as preserving their identities through the continued use of their languages. Survivors have played a key role in raising public awareness of the impacts of these institutions and advocating for recognition and justice. Such efforts led to the Indian Residential Schools Settlement Agreement, formal government apologies, and the establishment of the Truth and Reconciliation Commission of Canada (2008–2015). This contributed to widespread recognition of the historical injustices experienced by Indigenous peoples, including the imposition of Euro-Canadian culture by the federal government. In 2019, the residential school system was officially recognized as a National Historic Event in Canada, reflecting increased acknowledgment of its significance and long-term consequences for Indigenous communities. Parks Canada has worked with survivors and Indigenous communities to commemorate the residential school system through the installation of plaques at former residential school sites across Canada, marking its historical significance.

The National Centre for Truth and Reconciliation's National Student Memorial Register records at least 21 children who died while attending Pine Creek Residential School. Investigations have also been conducted at the site in recent years. Following reports from survivors describing abuse and disturbing experiences in the basement of Our Lady of Seven Sorrows Catholic Church, ground-penetrating radar identified fourteen anomalies. A subsequent excavation conducted by an archaeological team from Brandon University found no evidence of human remains.

Chief Derek Nepinak of Minegoziibe Anishinabe stated that the excavation results did not change the reality of the experiences faced by Indigenous families who attended Pine Creek Residential School. He also noted that the findings should not be considered conclusive for other investigations and emphasized the need for continued efforts to uncover the truth.

A commemorative monument was erected in 2019 near Our Lady of Seven Sorrows Roman Catholic Church to honour former students of the Pine Creek Residential School.
