= Saint-Marc-de-Figuery =

- Parish municipality
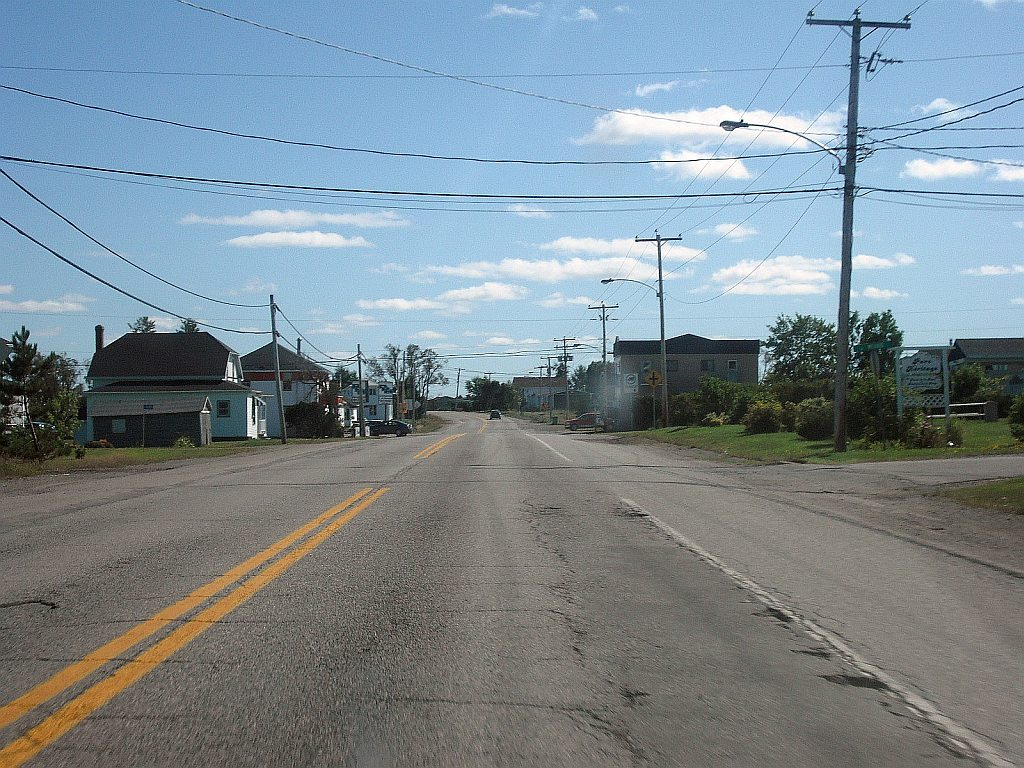
- Route 111 through St-Marc-de-Figuery

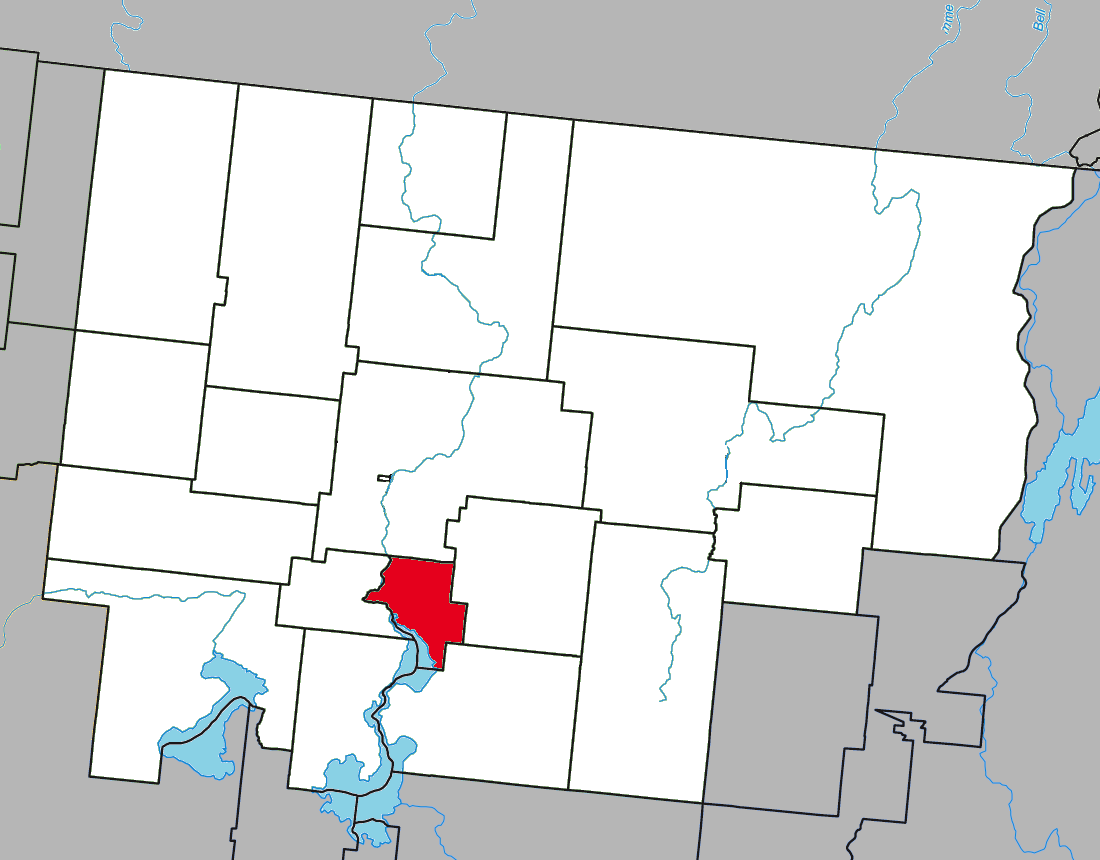
- Location within Abitibi RCM

- Location in western Quebec
- Coordinates: 48°28′N 78°03′W
- Country: Canada
- Province: Quebec
- Region: Abitibi-Témiscamingue
- RCM: Abitibi
- Settled: c. 1915
- Constituted: November 10, 1926
- Named for: Mark the Evangelist and Étienne-Guillaume Figuery

Government
  - Mayor: André Rioux
  - Federal riding: Abitibi—Témiscamingue
  - Prov. riding: Abitibi-Ouest

Area
  - Total: 92.80 km^{2} (35.83 sq mi)
  - Land: 80.79 km^{2} (31.19 sq mi)

Population (2021)
  - Total: 868
  - Density: 10.7/km^{2} (28/sq mi)
  - Pop (2016-21): ▲4.1%
  - Dwellings: 386
- Time zone: UTC−5 (EST)
  - Summer (DST): UTC−4 (EDT)
- Postal code(s): J0Y 1J0
- Area code: 819
- Highways: R-111 R-386
- Website: www.saint-marc-de-figuery.org

Saint-Marc-de-Figuery (French pronunciation: [sɛ̃ maʁk də fiɡəʁi]) is a parish municipality in the Canadian province of Quebec, located in the Abitibi Regional County Municipality. It is part of the census agglomeration of Amos.

== Demographics ==
In the 2021 Census of Population conducted by Statistics Canada, Saint-Marc-de-Figuery had a population of 868 living in 352 of its 386 total private dwellings, a change of 4.1% from its 2016 population of 834. With a land area of 80.79 km^{2} (31.19 sq mi), it had a population density of 10.7/km^{2} (27.8/sq mi) in 2021.

Historical census populations – Saint-Marc-de-Figuery

Year	Pop.	±%
1931	445	—
1941	558	+25.4%
1951	640	+14.7%
1956	656	+2.5%
1961	608	−7.3%
1966	631	+3.8%

Year	Pop.	±%
1971	619	−1.9%
1976	497	−19.7%
1981	533	+7.2%
1986	506	−5.1%
1991	584	+15.4%
1996	580	−0.7%

Year	Pop.	±%
2001	615	+6.0%
2006	692	+12.5%
2011	771	+11.4%
2016	834	+8.2%
2021	868	+4.1%

Population figures based on revised counts.
Source: Statistics Canada

Mother tongues spoken are:

- English as first language: 0%
- French as first language: 100%
- English and French as first language: 0%
- Other as first language: 0.6%

== Government ==
Municipal council (as of 2023):

- Mayor: André Rioux
- Councillors: Martin Thibeault, Gaetan Boutin, Mathieu Breton, Jocelyn Lantagne, Johanne Sabourin, Yvon Lantagne
