= Apologies to Indigenous peoples =

Acknowledgements of genocides and atrocities

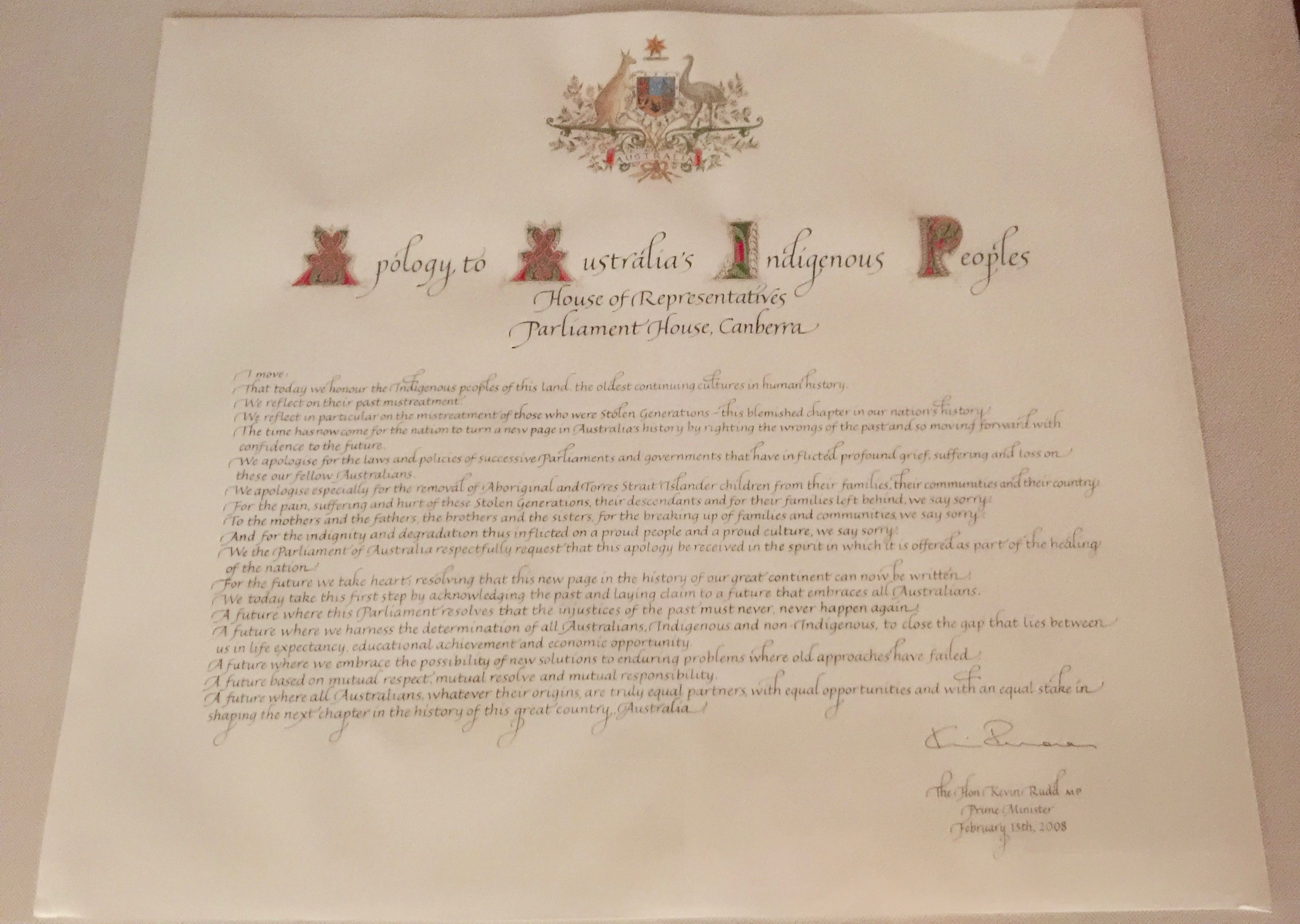
Apology to Australia's Indigenous people from the Prime Minister

Apologies to Indigenous peoples refer to apologies extended by political leaders or representatives, acting on behalf of a political entity or nation, to acknowledge and express remorse for a mass atrocity that has been committed against Indigenous peoples.

== Background ==
During the era of colonization, European empires colonized territories inhabited by Indigenous peoples and the colonies created new countries that would contain Indigenous peoples within their new political borders. In such processes, there were a series of atrocious crimes against Indigenous populations. Given that the dominant group has held political and economic power, these facts had not been officially investigated and recognized.

During colonialism, many Western officials have expressed concerns, enacted laws to protect Indigenous peoples, and have punished a few colonial agents for some of their colonial atrocities. Widely known examples are the Laws of Burgos and the New Laws in the Spanish Empire, which were poorly implemented. On occasion, some Indigenous government agencies committed atrocities, as is the case of the Indian Protection Service in Brazil as described in the Figueiredo Report, or the Office of Indigenous Affairs in the United States, who acknowledged its systemic shortcomings.

Indigenous groups have publicly requested apologies from a number of states and Christian churches for their historical or contemporary role in atrocities committed against Indigenous peoples. No country has ever voluntarily acknowledged committing genocide.

In 2023 Indigenous leaders from Antigua and Barbuda, Aotearoa (New Zealand), Australia, the Bahamas, Belize, Canada, Grenada, Jamaica, Papua New Guinea, Saint Kitts and Nevis, Saint Lucia, and Saint Vincent and the Grenadines issued an open letter. The signed letter requests King Charles III to acknowledge at his coronation the "horrific impacts" of colonization.

== Apologies to Indigenous peoples ==
=== Government apologies to Indigenous peoples ===
In recent decades governments have acknowledged past atrocities or apologized for the policies of previous governments. In their apologies, some state officials do not always agree with scholarly characterization of the atrocities.

From	To	Scope	Year of apology	Reference(s)
Argentina	Toba and Mocoví	Napalpí massacre, 1924	2022	
Australia	Indigenous peoples	Stolen generations, 1905-1970s	2008	
Belgium	Belgian Congo	Colonial abuse	2020	
Canada	Indigenous peoples	Canadian Indian residential school system, 1867-1998	2008, 2017	
Canada	Inuit	Forced relocation, mistreatment, dog slayings	2019, 2024	
California	Indigenous peoples	California genocide, 1846-1873	2019	
Catalonia	Indigenous peoples	Colonial abuse in Mexican conquest	2019	
Chile	Mapuche	Colonial abuse	2017	
Germany	Tanzania	Colonial killings	2023	
Germany	Herero and Nama	Herero and Nama genocide, 1904-8	2021	
Mexico	Maya peoples	Historical injustice and contemporary discrimination	2021	
Mexico	Yaqui	Marginalization, injustice and abuse	2021	
Netherlands	Suriname	Slave trade and atrocities committed against the Indigenous populations	2023	
Netherlands	Indonesia	Excessive violence, 1945-1949	2020	
Netherlands	Indonesia	Rawagede massacre	2011	
New Zealand	Moriori	Expropriation, slavery, and treaty breaking	2020	
Norway	Sámi	Norwegianization (forced assimilation)	1997, 2024	
El Salvador	Indigenous peoples	Oppression and extermination	2010	
United Kingdom	Tainui	Land appropriation and invasion	1995	
United Kingdom	Kĩkũyũ	Colonial abuse	2013	
United States	Guatemala	Role in Guatemalan Civil War in support for military government, 1960–96	1999	
United States	Native Hawaiians	Overthrow of the Hawaiian Kingdom, 1893	1993	
United States	Indigenous peoples	Violence, abuse and negligence	2000, 2010	
United States	Indigenous peoples	American Indian boarding schools, 1819-1969	2024	

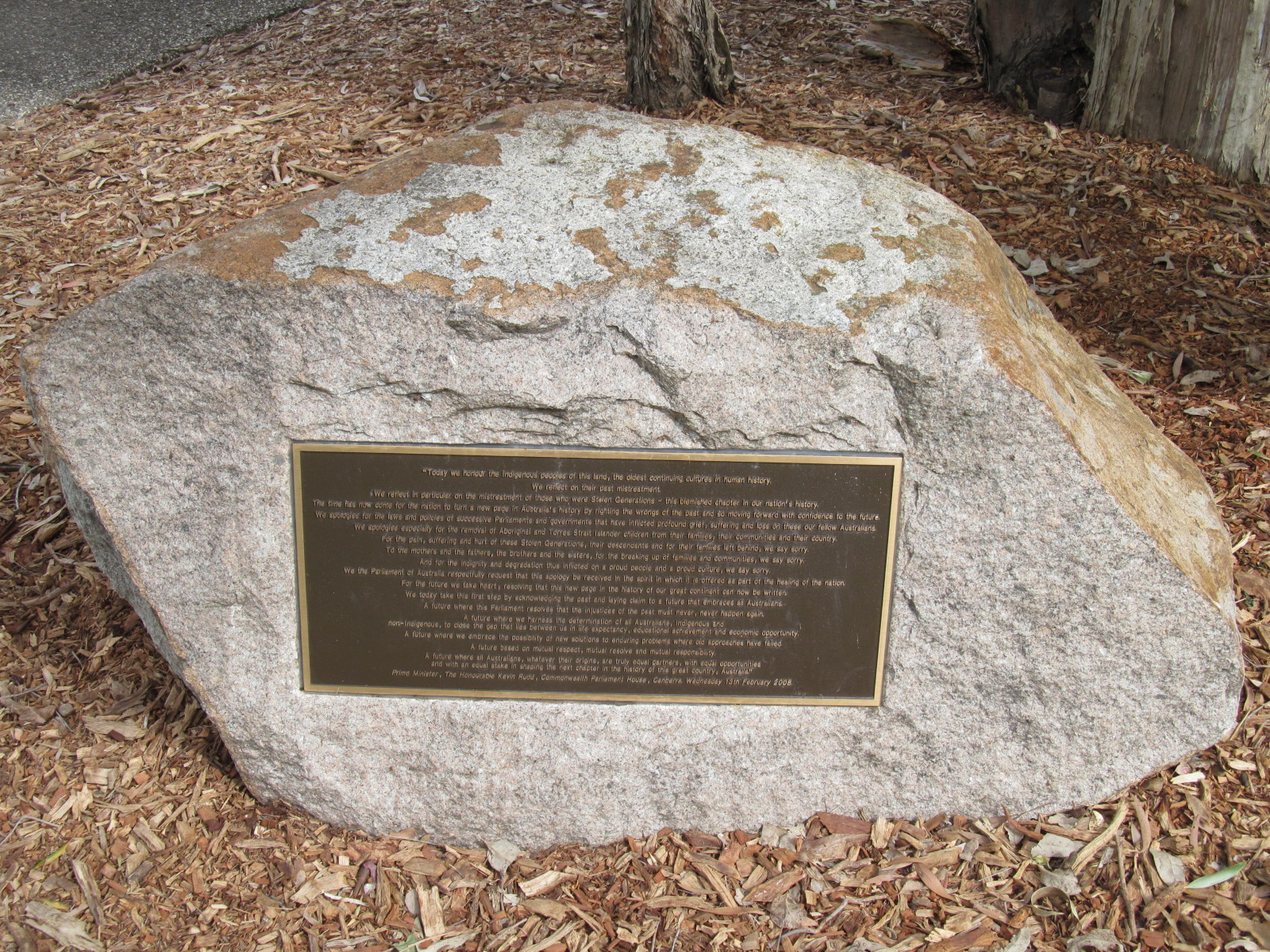
The apology plaque in Kalinga, Queensland, containing the key words from Kevin Rudd's 2008 speech to the Australian Parliament.

=== Apologies from religious institutions ===
Pope Francis apologized for the Catholic Church's role in colonization and for "crimes committed against the native peoples during the so-called conquest of America". He has also apologized for the Church's role in the operation of residential schools in Canada, qualifying it as genocide. In 2023, the Vatican rejected the Doctrine of Discovery.

In 2022 Justin Welby, the Primate of the Church of England, apologized to the Indigenous peoples in Canada for the role of the church in the Canadian Indian residential school system, adding to similar apologies by other churches in Canada such as the Anglican Church of Canada.

=== Other apologies ===
Scouts Canada has issued an apology for "its role in the eradication of First Nation, Inuit and Métis people for more than a century".

In 2016 the Australian Psychological Society apologized to Aboriginal Australians and Torres Strait Islanders. In 2023, the American Psychological Association issued an offer of apology to First Peoples for more than a century of harmful practices. In 2024, the Canadian Medial Association issued an apology for mistreatment and unethical experimentation.

== Criticism of the apologies ==
Professor Alice MacLachlan has criticized the apologies of the Australian and Canadian governments as they have apologized for specific policies, "avoiding the broader question of apologizing for a much longer history of genocidal appropriation and displacement." Francesca Dominello has said official apologies from Canada and Australia have done little to change the status quo for Indigenous peoples.

Indigenous historian Gary Foley has criticized the Australian government's apology for the Stolen Generations, as there is lack of compensation.

== See also ==
- Denial of genocides of Indigenous peoples
- Decolonization
- Genocide of Indigenous peoples
- Historiography of Indigenous genocide
- Indigenous and Tribal Peoples Convention, 1989
- Indigenous response to colonialism

== Bibliography ==
- Bentley, Tom. (2018). Colonial apologies and the problem of the transgressor speaking, Third World Quarterly, 39:3, 399-417, doi:10.1080/01436597.2017.1401922
- Corntassel, Jeff; Holder, Cindy. (2008). Who’s Sorry Now? Government Apologies, Truth Commissions, and Indigenous Self-Determination in Australia, Canada, Guatemala, and Peru. Human Rights Rev 9, Pages 465–489. https://doi.org/10.1007/s12142-008-0065-3.
- Organick, A. G. (2019). Non-Apology in the Age of Apology. Denning LJ, 31, 149.
- Short, D. (2012). When sorry isn’t good enough: Official remembrance and reconciliation in Australia. Memory Studies, 5(3), 293-304.
- Rothermund, D. (2011). The Self-consciousness of Post-imperial Nations: A cross-national Comparison. India Quarterly, 67(1), 1–18.
- Tager, Michael. (2014). Apologies to Indigenous Peoples in comparative perspective. The International Indigenous Policy Journal, 5(4).
