= Discovery doctrine =

Concept of public international law

The discovery doctrine, or doctrine of discovery, is a disputed interpretation of international law during the Age of Discovery, introduced into United States municipal law by the US Supreme Court justice John Marshall in Johnson v. McIntosh (1823). In Marshall's formulation of the doctrine, discovery of territory previously unknown to Europeans gave the discovering nation title to that territory against all other European nations, and this title could be perfected by possession. A number of legal scholars have criticized Marshall's interpretation of the relevant international law as being a colonial-era ideology. In recent decades, advocates for Indigenous rights have campaigned against the doctrine, which purportedly stemmed from some Papal bulls. In 2023, the Roman Curia of the Vatican formally repudiated the doctrine.

== Discovery in international law ==
The means by which a state can acquire territory in international law are conquest, cession by agreement, occupation of land which belongs to no state (terra nullius), and prescription through the continuous exercise of sovereignty. Discovery of a territory creates an incomplete, nascent title which must be completed within a reasonable period by effective occupation of that territory.

Law professor Robert J. Miller stated that by 1493, "The idea that the Doctrine [of discovery] granted European monarchs ownership rights in newly discovered lands and sovereign and commercial rights over Indigenous peoples due to first discovery by European Christians was now established international law, at least to Europeans." In 2016, law professor Kent McNeil, however, stated, "it is not apparent that such a rule was ever part of the European law of nations."

== Historical background ==
Miller and others trace the doctrine of discovery back to 15th century papal bulls which authorized various European powers to conquer the lands of non-Christians. In 1452, Pope Nicholas V issued the bull Dum Diversas, which authorized King Afonso V of Portugal to "subjugate the Saracens and pagans and any other unbelievers and enemies of Christ", and "reduce their persons to perpetual servitude", to take their belongings, including land, "to convert them to you, and your use, and your successors the Kings of Portugal." In 1455, Pope Nicholas V issued Romanus Pontifex, which extended Portugal's authority to conquer the lands of infidels and pagans for "the salvation of all" in order to "pardon ... their souls". The document also granted Portugal a specific right to conquest in West Africa and to trade with Saracens and infidels in designated areas. Charles and Rah argue that these bulls were used to justify the Atlantic slave trade.

In 1493, following a dispute between Portugal and Spain over the discovery of non-Christian lands in the Americas, Pope Alexander VI issued the Bulls of Donation. The first of these, Inter caetera, drew a north-south line 100 leagues West of the Cape Verde Islands. It gave the Catholic Monarchs of Spain exclusive rights to travel and trade west of that line, and to "bring under your sway the said mainland and islands with their residents and inhabitants and to bring them to the Catholic faith." A second on the same day, Eximiae devotionis, referred to the rights of the sovereigns of Castile and León. These were extended later in the year by a third bull, Dudum siquidem. In 1494, Portugal and Spain signed the Treaty of Tordesillas, which moved the line separating their spheres of influence to 300 leagues west of the Cape Verde Islands. The treaty was eventually endorsed by Pope Julius II in the 1506 bull Ea quae pro bono pacis.

Throughout the sixteenth century, Spain and Portugal claimed that papal authority had given them exclusive rights of discovery, trade and conquest of non-Christian lands in their respective spheres of influence. These claims were challenged by theorists of natural law such as the Spanish theologians Domingo de Soto and Francisco di Vitoria. In 1539 Vitoria wrote that the Spanish discovery of the Americas provides "no support for possession of these lands, any more than it would if they had discovered us."

France and England also made claims to territories inhabited by non-Christians based on first discovery, but disputed the notion that papal bulls, or discovery by itself, could provide title over lands. In 1541, French plans to establish colonies in Canada drew protests from Spain. In response, France effectively repudiated the papal bulls and claims based on discovery without possession, the French king stating that "Popes hold spiritual jurisdiction, and it does not lie with them to distribute land amongst kings" and that "passing by and discovering with the eye was not taking possession."

Similarly, when in 1580 Spain protested to Elizabeth I about Francis Drake's violation of the Spanish sphere, the English queen replied that popes had no right to grant the world to princes, that she owed no allegiance to the Pope, and that mere symbolic gestures (such as erecting monuments or naming rivers) did not give property rights.

From the sixteenth century, France and England asserted a right to explore and colonize any non-Christian territory not under the actual possession of a Christian sovereign. The stated justifications for this included the spread of Christianity, the duty to bring civilization to barbarian peoples, the natural right to explore and trade freely with other peoples, and the right to settle and cultivate uninhabited or uncultivated land.

Hugo Grotius, writing in 1625, stated that discovery does not give a right to sovereignty over inhabited land, "For discovery applies to those things which belong to no one." Dutch policy was to acquire land in North America by purchase from indigenous peoples.

By the eighteenth century, some leading theorists of international law argued that territorial rights over land could stem from the settlement and cultivation of that land. William Blackstone, in 1756, wrote, "Plantations or colonies, in distant countries, are either such where the lands are claimed by right of occupancy only, by finding them desert and uncultivated, and peopling them from the mother-country; or where, when already cultivated, they have been either gained by conquest, or ceded to us by treaties. And both these rights are founded upon the law of nature, or at least upon that of nations." Two years after Blackstone, Emer de Vattel, in his Le droit des gents (1758), drew a distinction between land that was effectively occupied and cultivated, and the unsettled and uncultivated land of nomads which was open to colonization.

All imperial European states enacted symbolic rituals to give notice of discovery and possession of lands to other states. These rituals included burying plates, raising flags, erecting signs, and naming territories, rivers or other features. More concrete claims of possession ranged from building forts to establishing settlements. Rituals of a transfer of sovereignty often involved trials, executions and other acts to symbolize that the laws of the colonizing power were in force.

European monarchs often asserted sovereignty over large areas of non-Christian territory based on purported discoveries and symbolic acts of possession. They frequently issued charters and commissions giving the grantees the power to represent the Crown and acquire property. While European states often acknowledged that indigenous peoples inhabiting these lands had property rights which had to be acquired through conquest, treaty or purchase, they sometimes acted as if territories were uninhabited and sovereignty and property rights could be acquired through occupation.

Summarizing the practices European states used to justify their acquisition of territory inhabited by indigenous peoples, McNeil states, "While Spain and Portugal favoured discovery and papal grants because it was generally in their interests to do so, France and Britain relied more on symbolic acts, colonial charters, and occupation." Benton and Strauman argue that European powers often adopted multiple, sometimes contradictory, legal rationales for their acquisition of territory as a deliberate strategy in defending their claims against European rivals.

== North American jurisprudence ==
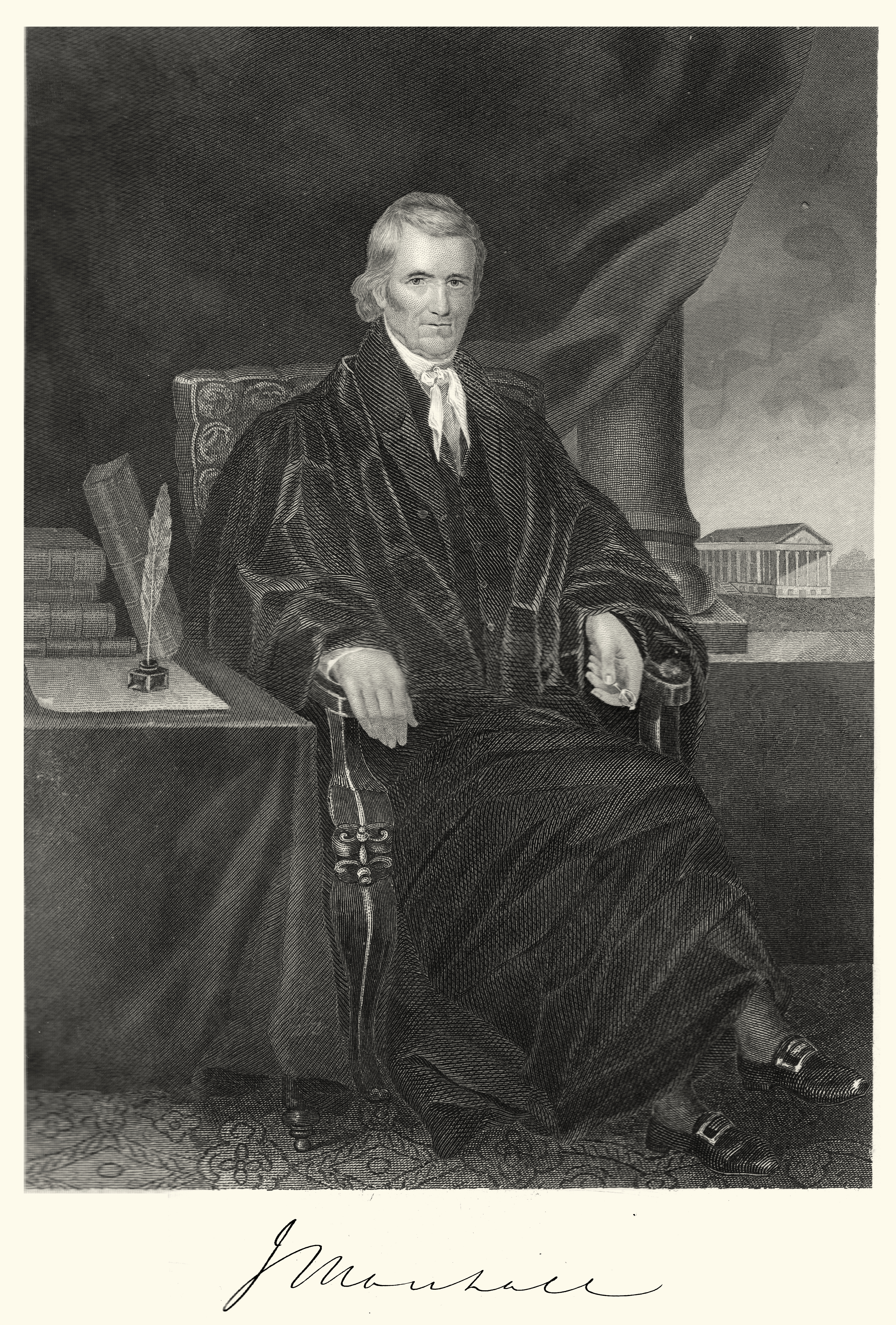
Chief Justice John Marshall

In 1792, U.S. Secretary of State Thomas Jefferson claimed that the doctrine of discovery was international law which was applicable to the new United States government as well.

The discovery doctrine was expounded by the United States Supreme Court in a series of decisions, most notably Johnson v. McIntosh in 1823. In that case, Chief Justice John Marshall held that under generally accepted principles of international law:

1. Discovery of lands previously unknown to Europeans gave the discovering nation title to that land against all other European nations, and this title could be perfected by possession.
2. The nation discovering that land had "the sole right of acquiring the soil from the natives, and establishing settlements upon it."
3. On discovery, the sovereignty of the indigenous peoples and their rights to sell their land were diminished, but their right of occupancy remained.
4. The discovering nation, having ultimate title to the land, had the right to sell the land of indigenous peoples, subject to the latter's right of occupancy.
5. This ultimate title of the discovering nation (in this case Britain) passed to the individual states after the Declaration of Independence, then to the United States in 1789.

Dunbar-Oritz states that the doctrine outlined in this case continues to influence American imperialism and treatment of indigenous peoples.

=== Johnson v. McIntosh ===
Banner and Kades argue that the 1823 case was the result of collusive lawsuits where land speculators worked together to make claims to achieve a desired result. The plaintiff, Johnson, had inherited land originally purchased from the Piankeshaw tribes. Defendant McIntosh claimed the same land, having purchased it under a grant from the United States. In 1775, members of the Piankeshaw tribe sold certain land in the Indiana Territory to Lord Dunmore, Royal Governor of Virginia, and others. In 1805, the Piankeshaw conveyed much of the same land to William Henry Harrison, governor of the Indiana Territory, thus giving rise to conflicting claims of title. The court found, on three grounds, that it should not recognize the land titles obtained from Native Americans prior to American independence. A number of academics and Indigenous rights activists have argued that Chief Justice John Marshall had large real estate holdings that would have been affected if the case were decided in favor of Johnson.

==== Decision ====
Marshall found that ultimate title to land comes into existence by virtue of discovery and possession of that land, a rule that had been observed by all European countries with settlements in the New World. The United States had ultimate title of the land, as against other European nations, because it inherited that title from the original discoverers Britain and France, as part of the sovereign rights the U.S. had won from the British crown through war.

Marshall noted:

On the discovery of this immense continent, the great nations of Europe ... as they were all in pursuit of nearly the same object, it was necessary, in order to avoid conflicting settlements, and consequent war with each other, to establish a principle which all should acknowledge as the law by which the right of acquisition, which they all asserted, should be regulated as between themselves. This principle was that discovery gave title to the government by whose subjects, or by whose authority, it was made, against all other European governments, which title might be consummated by possession. ... The history of America, from its discovery to the present day, proves, we think, the universal recognition of these principles.

Marshall stated, "Spain did not rest her title solely on the grant of the Pope. Her discussions respecting boundary, with France, with Great Britain, and with the United States, all show that she placed it on the rights given by discovery. Portugal sustained her claim to the Brazils by the same title." Marshall pointed to the exploration charters given to the explorer John Cabot as proof that other nations had accepted the doctrine.

==== Legal critique ====
Allison Dussias states that the Piankeshaw were not party to the litigation and therefore, "no Indian voices were heard in a case which had, and continues to have, profound effects on Indian property rights."

McNeil states that the authority for the doctrine of discovery, as formulated by Marshall, was "flimsy". Furthermore, Indigenous nations in North America were factually independent and sovereign prior to the arrival of Europeans and therefore the European powers should not have been able to acquire territorial sovereignty by discovery and settlement, but only by conquest or cession.

Pagden states that Marshall did not sufficiently consider Francisco de Vitoria's critique of the claim that discovery gave a right to possession of inhabited lands. Vitoria, however, stated that the Spanish could claim possession of the Americas by conquest if indigenous populations violated principles of natural law.

Blake Watson states that Marshall overlooked evidence showing that the Dutch and some English settlers acknowledged the right of Indians to their land and favored purchase as a means of acquiring title. Watson and others, such as Robert A. Williams Jr., state that Marshall misinterpreted the "discovery doctrine" as giving exclusive right to lands discovered, rather than the exclusive right to treaty with the inhabitants who owned that land.

=== Other United States cases ===
In Cherokee Nation v. Georgia (1831), the US Supreme Court found that the Cherokee Nation was a "domestic dependent nation" with no standing to take action against the state of Georgia.

In Worcester v Georgia (1832), Marshall re-interpreted the doctrine of discovery. He stated that discovery did not give the discovering nation title to land, but only "the sole right of acquiring the soil and making settlements on it." This was a right of preemption which only applied between the colonizing powers and did not diminish the sovereignty of the indigenous inhabitants. "It regulated the right given by discovery among the European discoverers, but could not affect the rights of those already in possession, either as aboriginal occupants, or as occupants by virtue of a discovery made before the memory of man."

In five further cases decided between 1836 and 1842, Mitchel I, Fernandez, Clark, Mitchel II, and Martin, the Supreme Court restored the rule in Johnson that discovery gave the discovering nation ultimate title to land, subject to a right of occupancy held by indigenous peoples.

In Oliphant v. Suquamish Indian Tribe (1979), the Supreme Court held that discovery deprived tribes of the right to prosecute non-Indians. In Duro v. Reina (1990) the court held that tribes could not prosecute Indians who were not a member of the prosecuting tribe. However in November 1990, the Indian Civil Rights Act was amended by Congress to permit inter-tribal prosecutions.

As of March 2023, the most recent time the doctrine was cited by the Supreme Court is in the 2005 case City of Sherrill v. Oneida Indian Nation of New York, by Justice Ruth Bader Ginsburg in the majority decision.

=== Impact on Canadian law ===
Johnson v M'Intosh was extensively discussed in St Catharines Milling and Lumber Co v R (1888), the first Canadian case on Indigenous land title. The judge in first instance stated that Marshall had "concisely stated the same law of the mother country". On appeal, however, the Privy Council departed from Johnson in finding that native land rights were derived from the Royal Proclamation of 1763.

In 1973, Calder v British Columbia (Attorney General), the Supreme Court of Canada found that the Indigenous peoples of Canada held an aboriginal title to their land, which was independent of the Royal Proclamation of 1763 and was derived from the fact that, "when the settlers came, the Indians were there, organized in societies and occupying the land as their forefathers had done for centuries".

In Tsilhqot'in Nation v British Columbia (2014), the Supreme Court of Canada confirmed that "the doctrine of terra nullius never applied in Canada". Aboriginal title is a beneficial interest in land, although the Crown retains an underlying title. The court set out a number of conditions which must be met in order for the Crown to extinguish Aboriginal title.

== Advocacy against the doctrine ==
Various United Nations (UN) forums have criticized the doctrine. In 2007, the UN adopted the Declaration on the Rights of Indigenous Peoples, which acknowledges the "rights of Indigenous peoples to their land". The only nations to vote against the declaration were the United States, Canada, Australia and New Zealand. All four would later reverse their positions.

The United Nations Permanent Forum on Indigenous Issues (UNPFII) noted the doctrine of discovery "as the foundation of the violation of their (Indigenous people) human rights". The eleventh session of the UNPFII called for a mechanism to investigate historical land claims, with speakers observing that "The Doctrine of Discovery had been used for centuries to expropriate Indigenous lands and facilitate their transfer to colonizing or dominating nations".

The General Convention of the US Episcopal Church, conducted on 8–17 August 2009, passed a resolution officially repudiating the discovery doctrine.

During the Ninth Session of the United Nations Permanent Forum on Indigenous Issues in April 2010, the Holy See addressed the doctrine, saying that it had been abrogated as early as 1494 by subsequent papal bulls, encyclicals, and pronouncements. It said that it considered Inter caetera as "a historic remnant with no juridical, moral or doctrinal value".

At the 2012 Unitarian Universalist Association General Assembly in Phoenix, Arizona, delegates passed a resolution repudiating the doctrine of discovery and calling on Unitarian Universalists to study the doctrine and eliminate its presence from the current-day policies, programs, theologies, and structures of Unitarian Universalism.

In 2013, at its 29th General Synod, the United Church of Christ repudiated the doctrine in a near-unanimous vote.

In 2014, Ruth Hopkins, a tribal attorney and former judge, wrote to Pope Francis asking him to formally revoke the Inter caetera papal bull of 1493.

At the 2016 Synod, 10–17 June in Grand Rapids, Michigan, delegates to the annual general assembly of the Christian Reformed Church rejected the doctrine of discovery as heresy in response to a study report on the topic.

At the 222nd General Assembly of the Presbyterian Church (U.S.A.) (2016), commissioners called on members of the church to repudiate the doctrine of discovery. The commissioners directed that a report be written reviewing the history of the doctrine. That report was approved by the 223rd General Assembly (2018), along with recommendations for a variety of additional actions that could be taken by the church at all levels to acknowledge indigenous peoples and to confront racism against them.

In 2016, the Churchwide Assembly of the Evangelical Lutheran Church in America (ELCA) adopted Assembly Action CA16.02.04 titled "Repudiation of the Doctrine of Discovery" by a vote of 912–28, describing the doctrine as "an example of the 'improper mixing of the power of the church and the power of the sword'".

On November 3, 2016, a group of 524 clergy publicly burned copies of Inter caetera, as part of the Dakota Access Pipeline protests near the Standing Rock Indian Reservation. As part of their demonstration, they invited a number of indigenous elders to authorize the burning.

The General Assembly of the Christian Church (Disciples of Christ) condemned and repudiated the Doctrine of Discovery in July 2017, noting it "continues to facilitate genocide, oppression, dehumanization, and the removal of Peoples from ancestral lands in the United States, Canada and globally".

The Royal Commission on Aboriginal Peoples, and the Truth and Reconciliation Commission of Canada have repudiated the doctrine and called on governments to remove it from laws and policies.

During Pope Francis's July 2022 penitential pilgrimage to Canada in light of the abuses of Canadian Indigenous children in residential schools, Canadian bishops requested that the Catholic Church issue a new statement on the doctrine of discovery.

On March 30, 2023, the Vatican's Dicasteries for Culture and Education and for Promoting Integral Human Development jointly repudiated the doctrine of discovery as "not part of the teaching of the Catholic Church". The Vatican's statement pointed to the 1537 papal bull, Sublimis Deus, which affirmed the liberty and property rights of indigenous peoples and prohibited their enslavement.

== See also ==
- Aboriginal title
- Americentrism
- Apologies to Indigenous peoples
- Colonialism
- Eurocentrism
- First contact (anthropology)
- Frontier thesis
- Imperialism
- Manifest destiny
- Monroe Doctrine
- Terra nullius
- Right of conquest
