= Denial of genocides of Indigenous peoples =

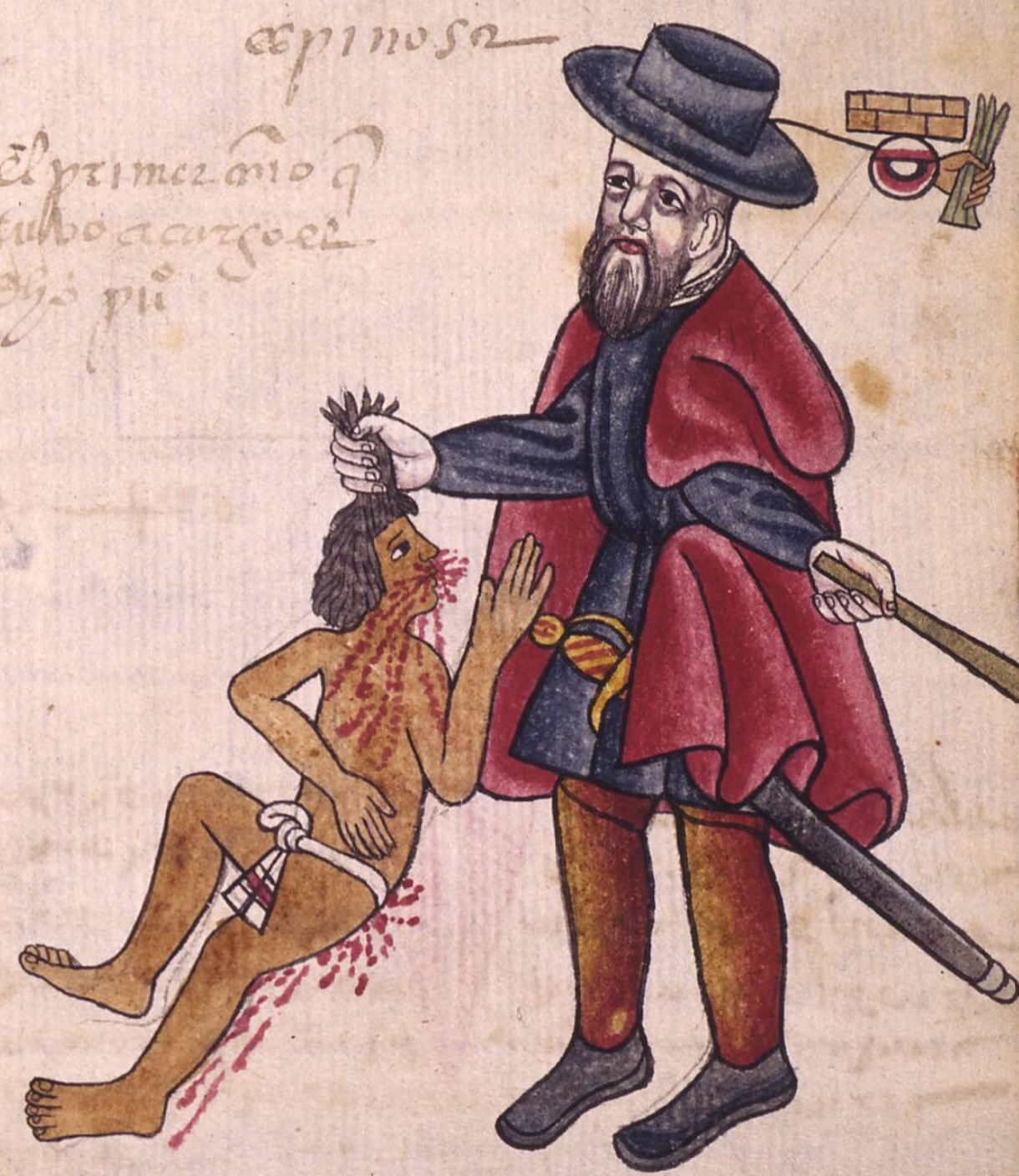
Spanish colonial abuse as part of the encomienda, depicted in the Codex Kingsborough, 16th century

Denial of genocides of Indigenous peoples, a form of genocide denial, consists of claims in which the multiple genocides and atrocity crimes which have been committed against Indigenous peoples are denied. The denialism claims contradict the academic consensus, which acknowledges the fact that genocides were committed. The claim is a form of denialism, genocide denial, historical negationism and historical revisionism. The atrocity crimes include genocide, crimes against humanity, war crimes, and ethnic cleansing.

During European colonization, many empires have colonized territories inhabited by what would be known today as Indigenous peoples. Many new colonies have surviving Indigenous peoples within their new political borders, and in this process, atrocities have been committed against Indigenous nations. The atrocities against Indigenous peoples have related to forced displacement, exile, introduction of new diseases, forced containment in reservations, forced assimilation, forced labour, criminalization, dispossession, land theft, compulsory sterilization, forcibly transferring children of the group to another group, separating children from their families, enslavement, captivity, massacres, forced religious conversion, cultural genocide, and reduction of means of subsistence and subsequent starvation and disease.

Non-Indigenous scholars are now increasingly examining the impact of settler colonialism and internal colonialism from the perspective of Indigenous peoples.

== Background ==
=== Defining genocide ===
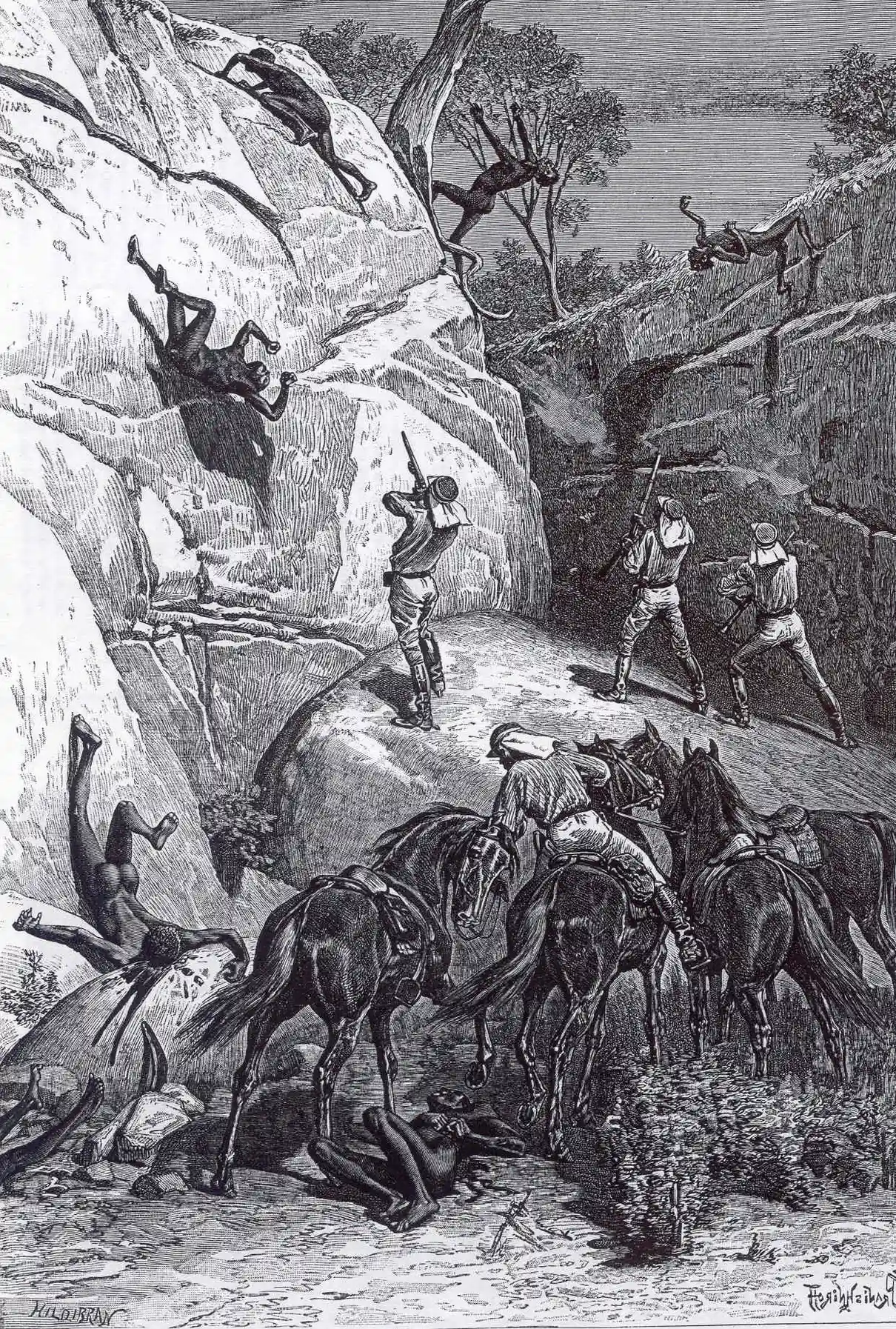
An 1888 drawing of a massacre by Queensland's police at Skull Hole, Mistake Creek, near Winton, Australia.

In 1948, the Genocide Convention defined genocide as any of five "acts committed with intent to destroy, in whole or in part, a national, ethnical, racial or religious group". These five acts include killing members of the group, causing them serious bodily or mental harm, imposing living conditions intended to destroy the group, preventing births, and forcibly transferring children out of the group. Additional scholarly definitions have been used to examine the diverse history of genocide, including those that include cultural and ethnic genocide as per Raphael Lemkin.

Edward S. Herman and Noam Chomsky have argued that definitions of key terms, as well as the attention a society provides to a specific issue, such as genocide, is the product of mass media, as they mention in Manufacturing Consent: "A propaganda system will consistently portray people abused in enemy states as worthy victims, whereas those treated with equal or greater severity by its own government or clients will be unworthy". Thus, Chomsky views the term genocide as one that is used by those in positions of political power and media prominence against their rivals, but people in positions of power will avoid using the term to describe their own actions, past and present.

Bradley Campbell has proposed a theory of genocide as a function of minority status, social segregation, low population size, and lack of visibility. Further factors include marginalization, the lack of political representation, and lower economic or social status.

In the latter part of the 20th century, the genocide of Indigenous peoples attracted more attention from the international community, including scholars and human rights organizations.

=== Rationalization ===
American academic and activist Gregory Stanton has described ten stages of genocide, in which the ninth stage is extermination and the tenth is denial. During this final stage, Stanton argues that individuals and government may "deny that these crimes meet the definition of genocide", "question whether intent to destroy a group can be proven", and "often blame what happened on the victims". The concept of denial as the final stage of genocide has been discussed in more detail in the 2021 textbook Denial: The Final Stage of Genocide? Stanton also indicates that stages often co-occur; the first eight stages include classification, symbolization, discrimination, dehumanization, organization, polarization, preparation, and persecution. Early denial of genocide often occurred through these stages. For instance, American historian David Stannard explained that European colonizers "purposefully and systematically dehumaniz[ed] the people they were exterminating".

Further, South African sociologist Leo Kuper has described denial as a routine defense, referring to it as a consequence of the Genocide Convention. He argues that denial has become more prevalent because genocide is considered "an international crime with potentially significant sanctions by way of punishment, claims for reparation, and restitution of territorial rights".

== Denial examples ==
According to Robert K. Hitchcock, editor of Modern Genocide, "the destruction of Indigenous peoples and their cultures has been a policy of many of the world's governments, although most government spokespersons argue that the disappearance or disruption of Indigenous societies was not purposeful but rather occurred inadvertently." In 2013, Colin Leach et al. found that perpetrator groups denied their group's responsibility, showed low levels of collective guilt, and had low support for reparation policies.

=== North America ===
According to a survey conducted between 2016 and 2018, "36% of Americans almost certainly believe that the United States is guilty of committing genocide against Native Americans." Indigenous author Michelle A. Stanley writes that "Indigenous genocide is largely denied, erased, relegated to the distant past, or presented as inevitable". She writes that Indigenous genocide is depicted broadly, without touching on the pattern of a series of separate genocides against multiple distinct tribal nations. Seneca scholar Melissa Michal Slocum said that Native American genocide has been denied by the United States.

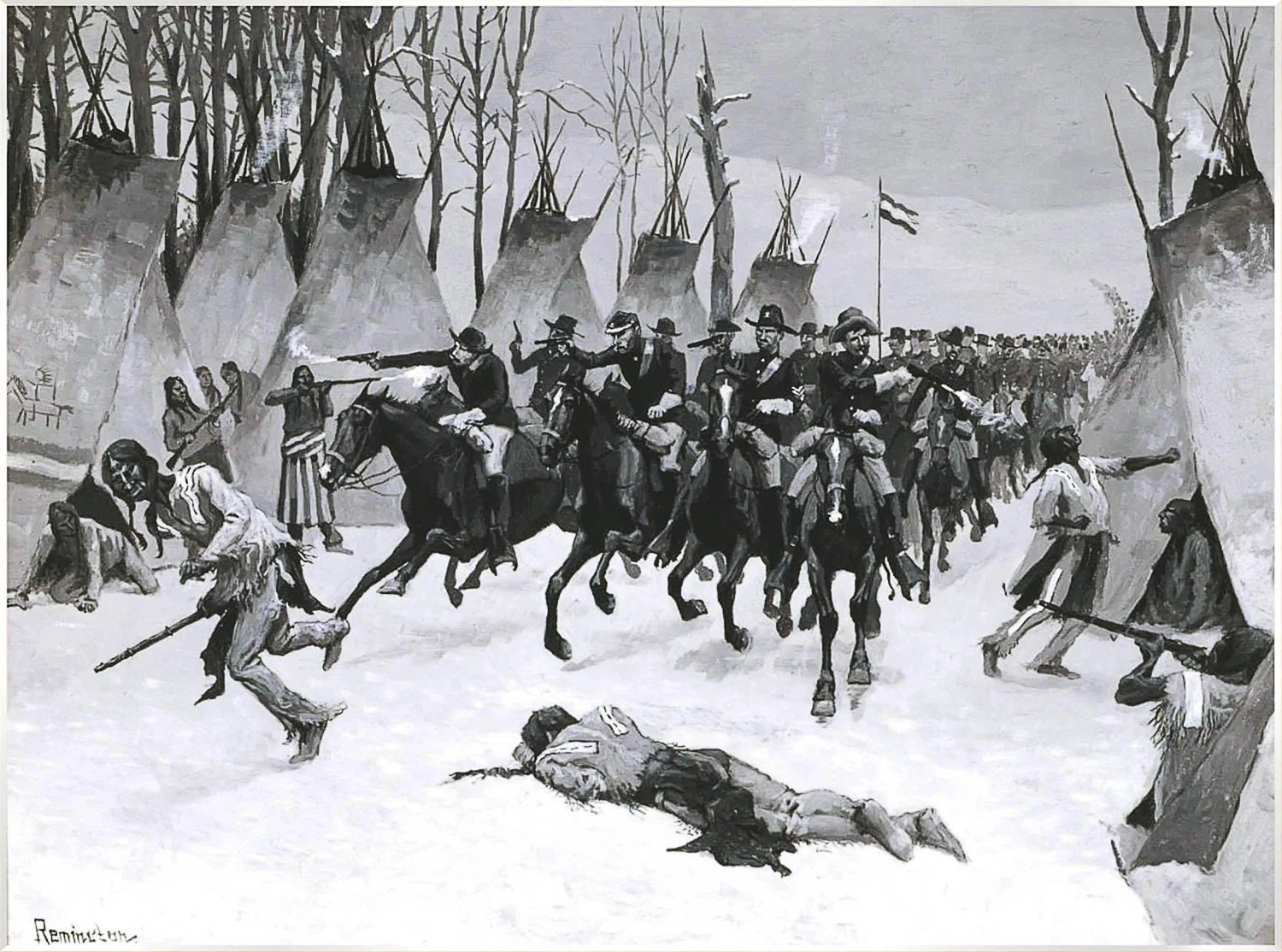
Sand Creek massacre, 1864

According to North American Genocides, edited by Clarke et al., many American scholars deny Indigenous genocide in the Americas, despite agreement from international scholars that it occurred. American historian Ned Blackhawk said that nationalist historiographies have been forms of denial that erase the history of destruction of European colonial expansion. Blackhawk said that near consensus has emerged that genocide against some Indigenous peoples took place in North America following colonization.

Some historians do not consider that genocide of Indigenous peoples took place in North America, including James Axtell, Robert Utley, William Rubinstein, Guenter Lewy and Gary Anderson, although some call the atrocities another name such as ethnic cleansing. Other scholars, including Elazar Barkan and Walter L. Hixson agree with the sentiment that those in the Americas deny the genocide of the regions' Indigenous populations.

On the Columbus Quincentenary, American historian David Stannard highlighted the numerous celebrations and festivities surrounding Columbus alongside "American and European denials of culpability for the most thoroughgoing genocide in the history of the world have assumed a new guise." A similar issue arose when Lynne Cheney, then chair of the National Endowment for the Humanities, rejected a television project celebrating the anniversary, highlighted the proposal's use of the word "genocide". Cheney stated, "We might be interested in funding a film that debated that issue, but we are not about to fund a film that asserts it. Columbus was guilty of many sins, but he was not Hitler." The comparison to the Holocaust has been raised by others as well, with American historian David Stannard pointing to the Holocaust's prominent position in the public eye compared to the global ignorance of atrocities in the Americas.

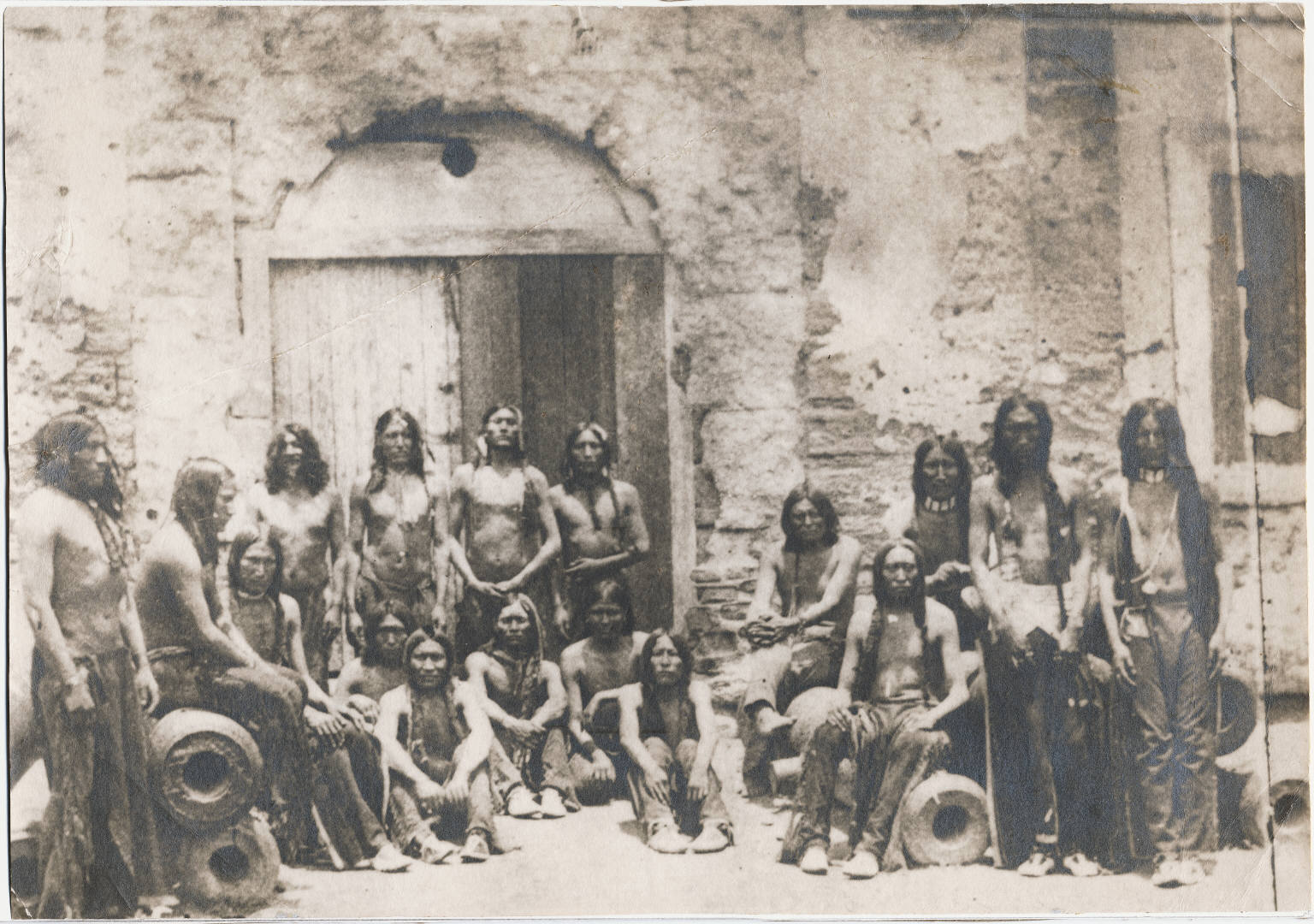
Indigenous prisoners of Red River War, 1875.

Howard Zinn, Susan Cameron, and Kirsten Dyck have claimed that in American history textbooks, America's history of abuse against Indigenous peoples is mostly ignored or presented from the state's point of view.

In The Other Slavery, American historian Andrés Reséndez compares the thousands of books written about the slavery of Africans to the couple dozen books about Indigenous slavery and argues that the latter has "almost completely erased from our historical memory". He argues that African slavery is more widely accepted because it was legalized and therefore recorded, whereas Indigenous slavery was largely illegal; further, because African slaves needed to be transported, settlers kept record of ship manifests.

Canadian political scientist Adam Jones has said that the historical revisionism has been so thorough that in some cases, the Americas have been depicted as unpopulated before European colonization.

Other claims against the genocide of Indigenous people of the Americas deal with the natural superiority of the European colonizers. For instance, Stannard has argued that British journalist Christopher Hitchens's 1992 essay, "Minority Report", supported social Darwinism.

==== California ====
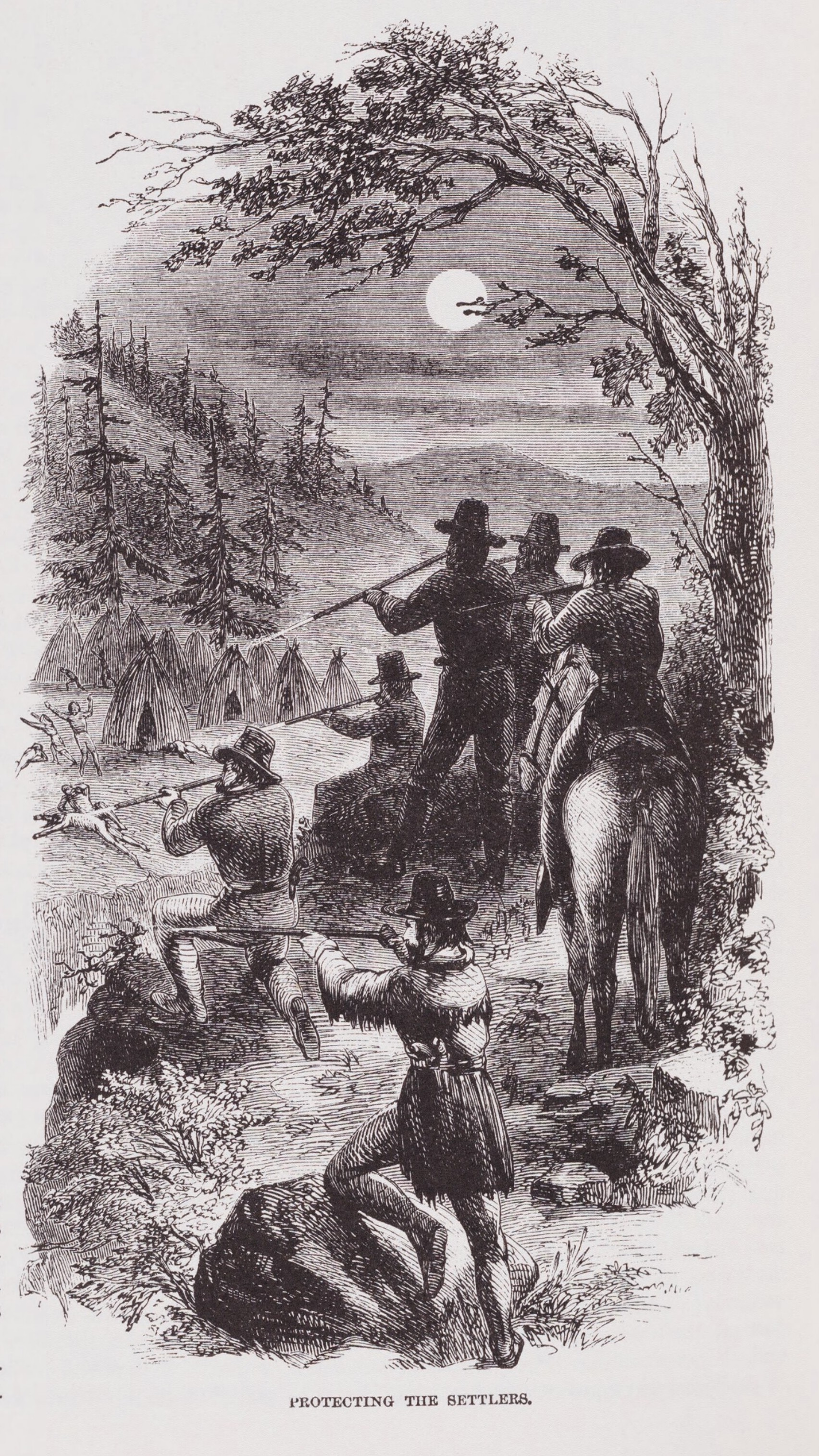
J. Ross Browne, "Protecting the Settlers". 1861. This image accompanied an article by Browne in which he described the killing of Yuki people at Round Valley, California.

Robert K. Hitchcock says that during the California genocide, "California state legislators, administrators, Indian agents, and townspeople denied that a genocide was happening."

Continuing into the 21st century, Benjamin Madley has stated that the California genocide has "too often concealed, denied, or suppressed". This can be evidenced via social science and history textbooks approved by the California Department of Education that ignore the history of this genocide.

In 2015, English writer and political activist George Monbiot argued that when the Catholic Church canonized 18th-century Christian missionary Junípero Serra, who "founded the system of labour camps that expedited California's cultural genocide", they were, in effect, denying the genocide.

Jeffrey Ostler points out that Indigenous genocide has been denied in California, but Ostler places the process seen during the California gold rush as a genocide given its structural nature.

==== Canada ====
Despite decades of recognition and acknowledgments denialism claims is a factor within Canadian society. A minority of Canada scholars disagree with use of the term genocide for Canada because of legal challenges associated with proving genocidal intent, while most believe using the term genocide is essential to recognize the seriousness of the ethnocide suffered, and avoiding it is a form genocide denialism.

=== South America ===
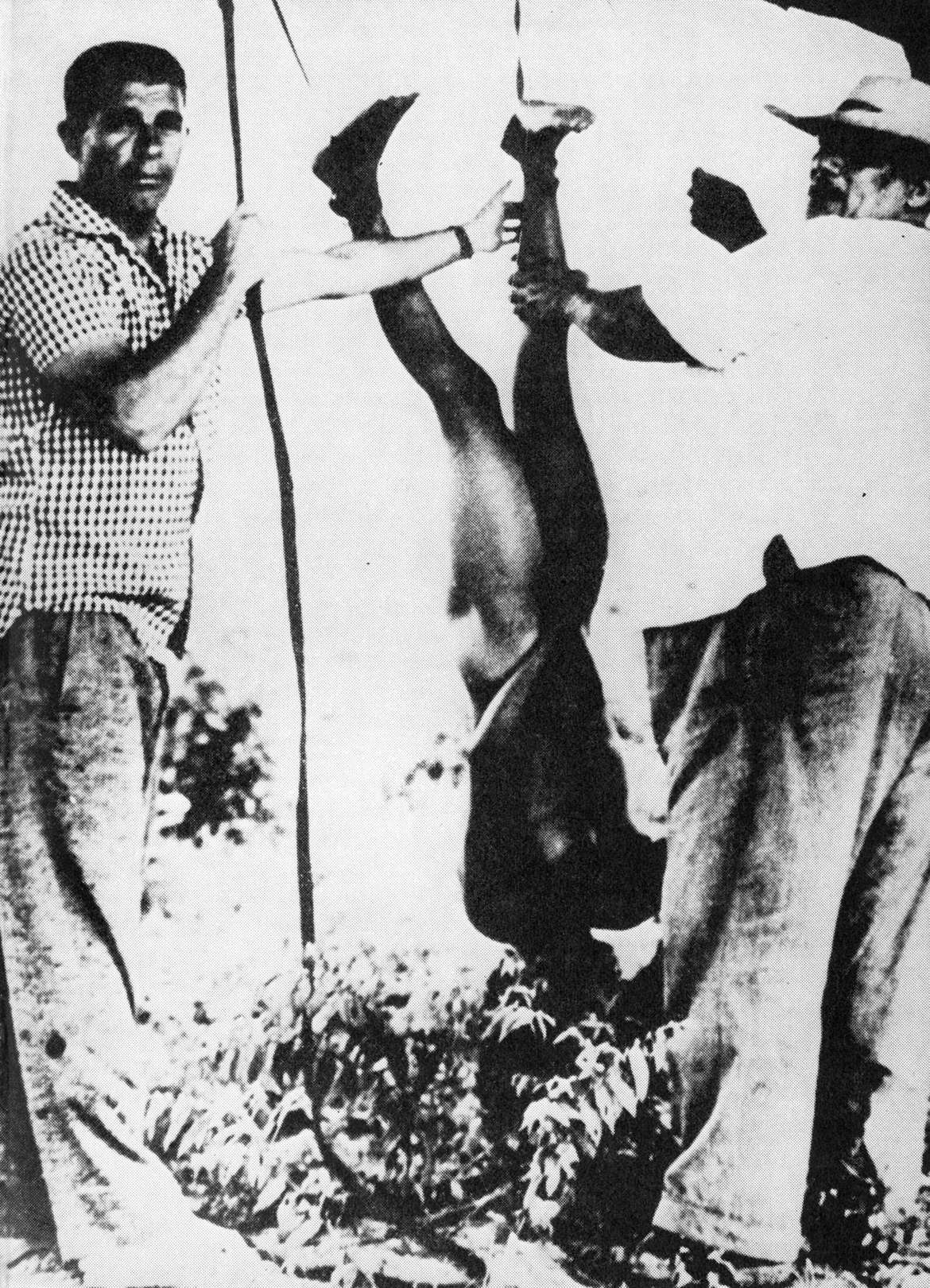
Atrocities against the Cinta Larga tribe in Brazil were exposed in the Figueiredo report of 1967. After shooting the head off her baby, the killers cut the mother in half. Survival

According to Nadia Rubaii, the mass atrocities in Latin America have been less visible internationally for three reasons:

1. Victim groups have frequently been attacked for their ideological or political differences, leading the international community to consider such atrocities as domestic political issues.
2. Perpetrators who damage ecosystems and means of subsistence argue that they are seeking economic development for common benefit and deny the intention to inflict any harm.
3. If there is academic attention to the topic, it is documented in Spanish or Portuguese and not in English.

==== Argentina ====
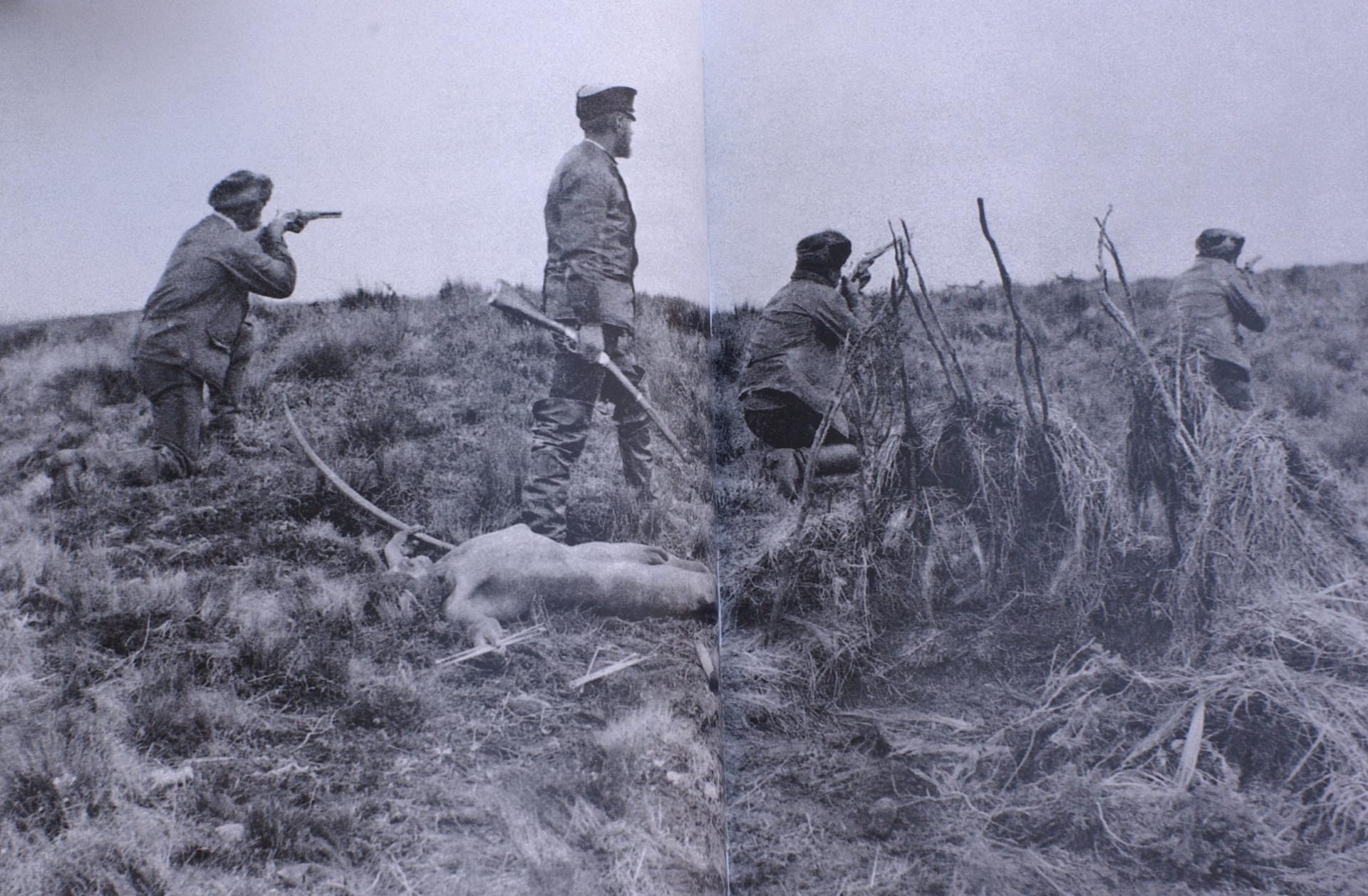
Julius Popper targeting Indigenous peoples. 1886. See Selk'nam Genocide.

In Argentina, the Conquest of the Desert had been interpreted in war terms, silencing the fact of Indigenous genocide. In the case of the Napalmi massacre, a judge concluded that the massacre took place in a context of genocide. According to Walter Delrio et al. in 2010, "The state still denies the existence of genocide and the existence of crimes against humanity with respect to Indigenous peoples."

==== Paraguay and Brazil ====
South African sociologist and genocide scholar Leo Kuper says that genocide has been denied in Paraguay and Brazil on the basis of alleged lack of intent to destroy. For instance, the case of the Ache in Paraguay has been legally determined to be a case of political persecution.

=== Central America ===
In Guatemala, debate has occurred over accusations of genocide. The Guatemalan Truth Commission has reported genocide during the 35 year civil war, but some Guatemalan politicians have referred to the conflict as a civil war.

=== Africa ===
The Herero genocide is described as the first genocide of the 20th century. In 2012, German politician Uwe Kekeritz said Germany needed to move away from "a culture of denial".

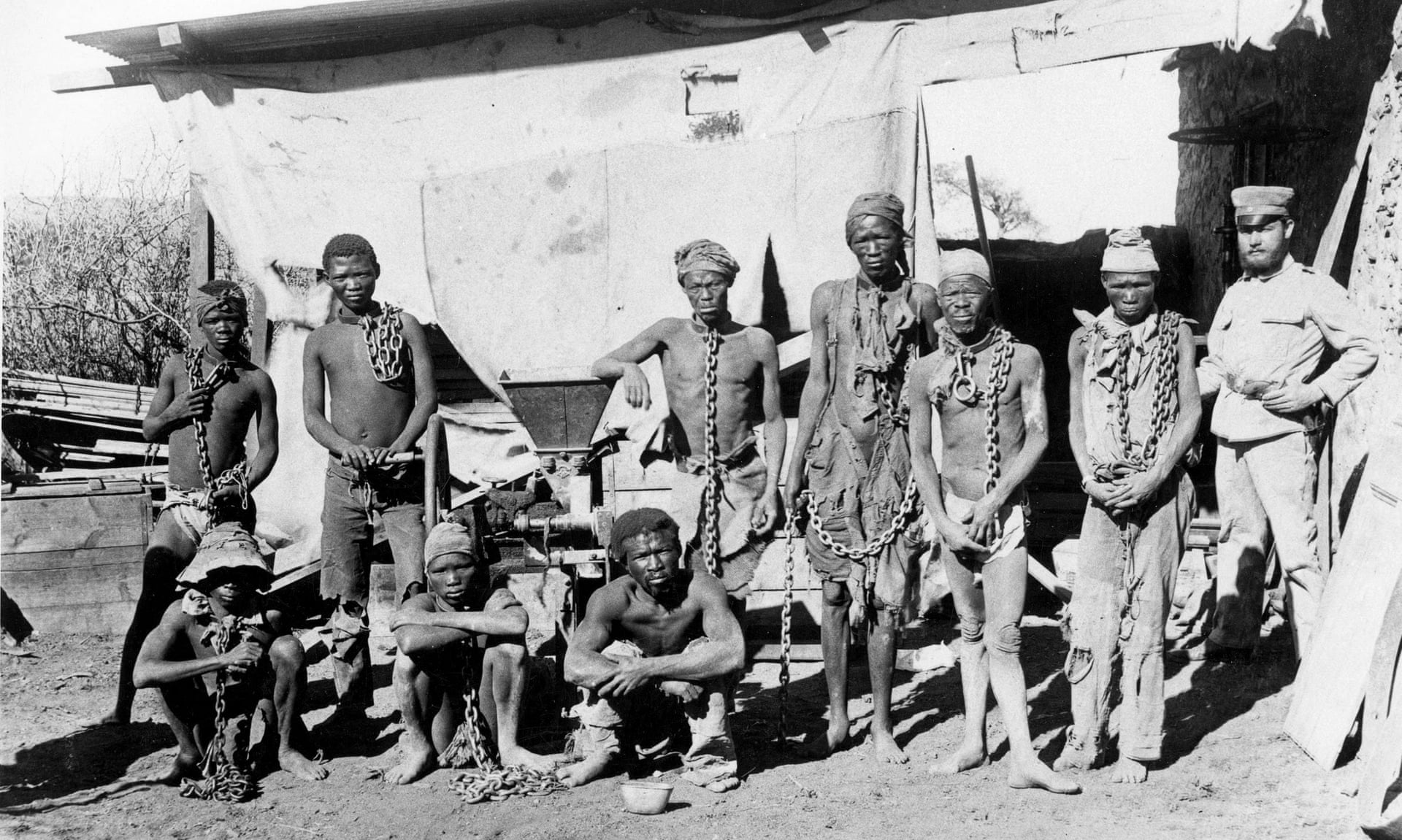
Prisoners from the Herero and Nama genocide, 1904-1907

=== Asia ===
Efforts to deny that Israel is committing genocide against Palestinians during the Gaza war include challenging the scale and intent of Israeli military actions, casting doubt on casualty statistics, reframing Israel's actions as lawful self-defense, and portraying critics as antisemitic or aligned with Hamas. Observers say that such rhetoric mirrors long-established patterns in other cases of genocide denial – most prominently the denial of the Armenian genocide – employing strategies of deflection, victim-blaming, moral inversion, and legalistic reinterpretation. As with other cases of genocide denial, it includes efforts to suppress information and criticism.

Besides being the position of the government of Israel, other states that deny the Gaza genocide include supporters of Israel such as the United States, the United Kingdom, and Germany.

=== Australia ===
Australia has a long history of Indigenous genocide denialism, with the country's treatment of its Indigenous populations being one of the most notorious examples. This denialism has manifested in various ways, from downplaying the severity of the violence to shifting blame onto the victims themselves. Debates regarding genocide in Australia have primarily concentrated on historical frontier killings and the removal of children. Since the 1830s, British colonists in Australia have tried to justify the disappearance of indigenous peoples by blaming disease and displacement. Although the term 'genocide' was not used in the 19th century, many colonists called for the extermination of Aborigines who resisted settlement. Awareness of genocide issues was hidden until the 1960s when historians began to explore frontier violence, gaining official support in the 1990s. However, cultural barriers, like 'Holocaust consciousness,' hinder broader acknowledgment of these events, impacting the political understanding of Australia's history. There are still numerous Australian historians who uphold the view that massacres and removal of Indigenous children was neither genocidal nor racist, but instead an action of state intervention.

The Indigenous Australian population experienced the frontier wars, in which there was conflict over territory. Massacres and mass poisonings and the Stolen Generations that saw the displacement of Indigenous children.

According to Hannah Baldry, "The Australian Government appears to have long suffered a form of 'denialism' that has consistently deprived the country's Aboriginal population of acknowledgment of the crimes perpetrated against their ancestors." This includes ongoing debates about the interpretation of history, including calling Australia's national myth as an invasion or settlement.

Former Prime Minister John Howard refused to apologize in the Motion of Reconciliation, claiming that the program had no genocidal intent. (Note: Former Labour Minister Gary Jones also portrayed colonialism as a gift to Indigenous nations. Australian Aboriginal senator, Jana Stewart, called such views a denial of First Nations' historical experiences.) Former Tasmanian Premier Ray Groom said that "there had been no killing in the island state".

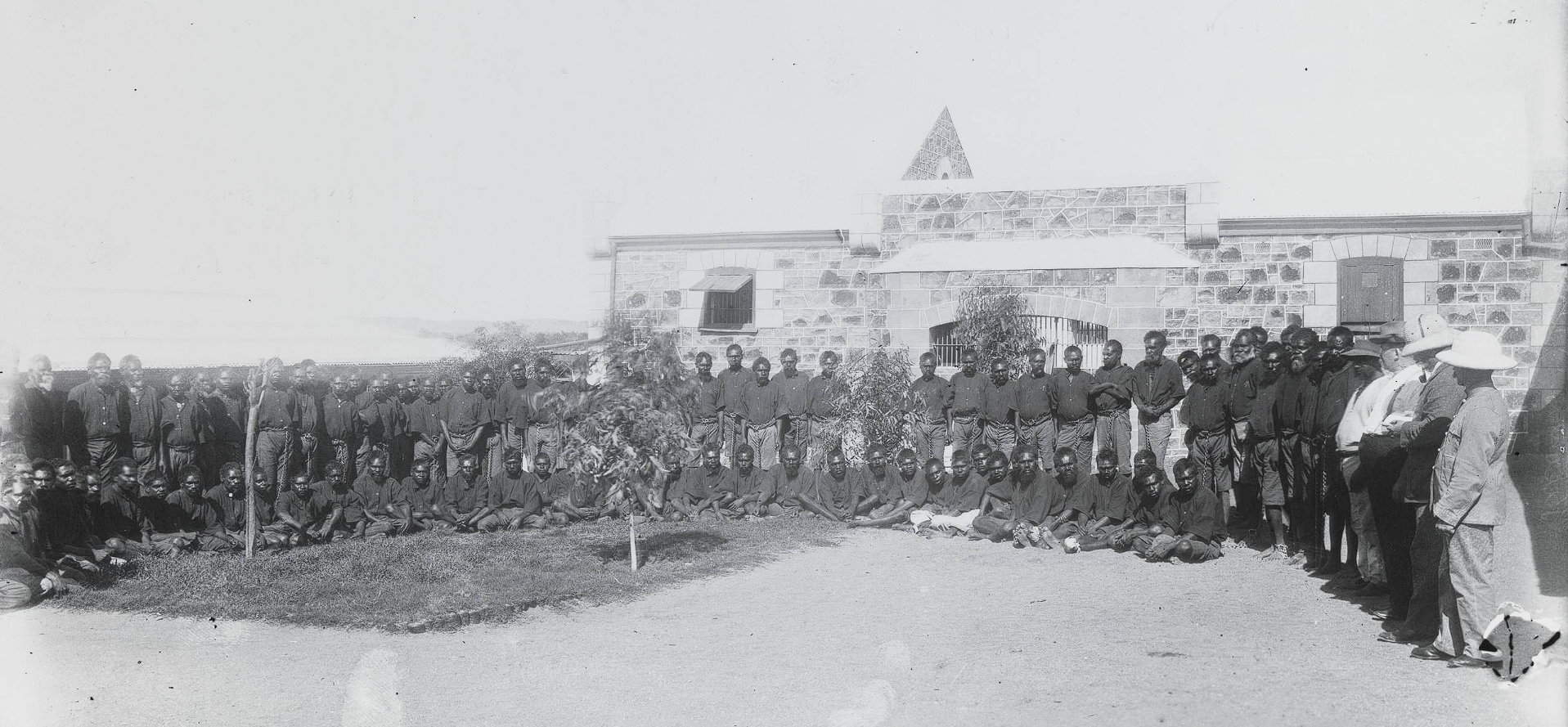
Between 1838 and 1931, Aboriginal prisoners held on Rottnest Island, Australia were held in deplorable conditions and subjected to cruel and inhumane treatment.

The Australian literary and cultural journal Quadrant has been considered "a key locus of genocide denial". They included common arguments regarding the definitional status of genocide, including the idea "that 'half castes' could not claim Aboriginal status since they were half-European" and that Indigenous people were to blame for their fate due to "their own backwardness"; other articles argued that "frontier massacres were based on misinterpreted statistics and falsehoods".

== Reactions ==
A number of states have chosen to take a firm stance against the denial of genocide by enacting laws to criminalize it. The extent of legal coverage varies from one state to another.

== See also ==
- Analysis of Western European colonialism and colonization
- Apologies to Indigenous peoples
- Colonialism and genocide
- Genocide recognition politics
- Genocides in history
- Genocide studies
- Historiography of Indigenous genocide
- Holocaust denial
- Index of racism-related articles
- Indigenous response to colonialism
- List of ethnic cleansing campaigns
- List of genocides
- Outline of genocide studies
- Truth commission
- War and genocide
