= Historiography of Indigenous genocide =

Historiography on Indigenous genocide

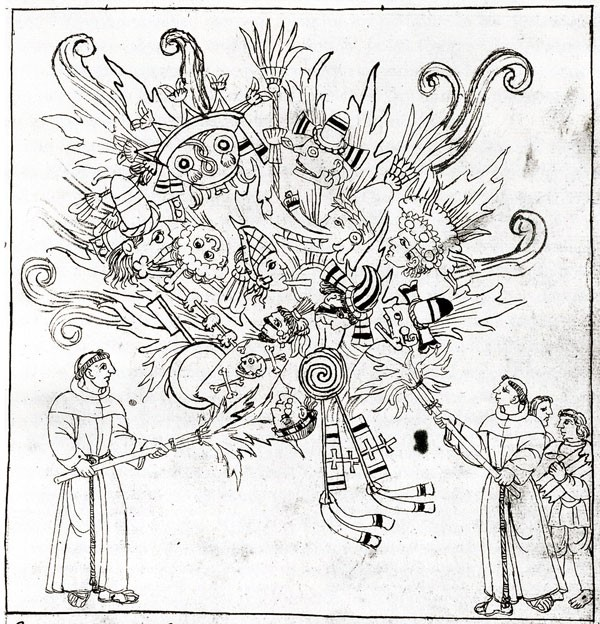
Destruction of Mexican Codices

The historiography of Indigenous genocide is the study of how the history of Indigenous genocides have been documented, recorded, narrated, summarized and sometimes even silenced by historians, scholars and societies throughout the colonial age up to today. This field has evolved significantly over time, as perspectives on colonialism, the definitions of genocide, and the production of Indigenous histories have changed.

== Overview ==
Historian Samuel Totten and Professor Robert K. Hitchcock stated in their work on genocide historiography that the genocide of Indigenous peoples became a public issue for many non-Indigenous scholars until after the last part of the twentieth century.

American historian Ned Blackhawk said that nationalist historiographies have been forms of denial that erase the history of destruction of European colonial expansion. Blackhawk said that near consensus has emerged that genocide against some Indigenous peoples took place in North America following colonization.

Historian Jeffrey Ostler says that in older historiography, key events in genocidal massacres in the context of U.S. Army missions to dominate Indian nations of the American West were narrated as battles. The concept of genocide has had a modest impact on the writing of American Indian history.

Benjamin Madley highlighted that the Genocide Convention designates genocide a crime whether committed in time of peace or war. He has argued that the violent Indigenous resistance to genocidal campaigns have been described as war or battles, instead of genocidal massacres. He defines genocidal massacres as:

"...massacres are the intentional killing of five or more disarmed combatants or largely unarmed noncombatants, including women, children, and prisoners, whether in the context of a battle or other wise. Massacres, when they form part of a pattern targeting a national, ethnic, racial, or religious group, are frequently genocidal."

Benjamin Madley performed a case study of the Modoc War, comparing details of death tolls in both sides in the conflict, to support this point. He said that throughout the world, groups targeted for annihilation resist, often violently. The penalty for the death of a white man resulted in the loss of the lives of a hundred California Indians for each incident.

Madley also studied two cases of genocide (Pequot and Yuki) analyzing four elements: statements of genocidal intent, presence of massacres, state-sponsored body-part bounties (rewards officially paid for corpses, heads and scalps) and mass death in government custody. He suggests that detailed breakdown of genocide studies by individual nation is a new direction in genocide studies: "...offering a powerful tool with which to understand genocide and combat its denial around the world."

The Canadian Historical Association has maintained that the Canadian historical profession was complicit in denial and also said in a statement: "Settler governments, whether they be colonial, imperial, federal, or provincial have worked, and arguably still work, towards the elimination of Indigenous peoples as both a distinct culture and physical group." Some historians disagreed and issued a letter against and for the claim of broad consensus in the view of this aspect of Canadian history. Professors Sean Carleton and Andrew Woolford say that there is scholar consensus on genocide in Canada: "In the end, a broad scholarly consensus has indeed emerged in recent years that agrees on the applicability of genocide in the Canadian context."

David Moshman, a professor at University of Nebraska–Lincoln, highlighted the lack of awareness of the fact that Indigenous nations are not a monolithic entity, and many have disappeared: "The nations of the Americas remain virtually oblivious to their emergence from a series of genocides that were deliberately aimed at, and succeeded in eliminating, hundreds of Indigenous cultures."

== See also ==
- Denial of genocides of Indigenous peoples
- Genocide denial
- Genocides in history
- Genocides of Indigenous peoples
- History wars
