= General Synods of the United Church of Christ =

The General Synod of the United Church of Christ is the national decision-making body for the denomination, responsible for giving general direction to the evangelistic, missionary, and justice programs of the UCC. Because the UCC holds to an explicitly congregational polity, though, any decisions made by the Synod are not binding upon the UCC's congregations (or its associations or conferences) in any way, though the national offices and the UCC's Constitution and Bylaws expect serious consideration to be given them. The Synod is the legal successor the General Council of the Congregational Christian Churches and the General Synod (its namesake) of the Evangelical and Reformed Church. The Synod is responsible for authorizing budgets and electing board members for the "Covenanted Ministries" (formerly known as instrumentalities) of the UCC; those agencies have evolved over the years from a number of separate entities, with different organizational structures, into a more coordinated configuration in order to serve the denomination more efficiently. The home and international missions agencies in particular were the descendants of Congregationalist (originally interdenominational) boards founded in the 19th century; they were "recognized" when the UCC began during the period between 1957 and 1961. The Synod usually makes pronouncements and passes resolutions on social and political issues judged to be of concern by delegates as well; most if not all have historically reflected liberal theological and political perspectives, including support for civil rights, feminism, environmentalism, and rights for homosexuals.

== Delegates ==
The Synod itself is composed of delegates, either clergy or lay, from the 36 conferences of the UCC, apportioned in a manner similar to states in the United States House of Representatives, with each conference assigned a minimum of three delegates regardless of its membership size as a proportion of the national membership. The national bylaws permit a minimum of 675 delegates from all conferences, but no more than 725. Others receiving vote in Synod include the denomination's officers, the corporate members of the United Church of Christ Board (formerly the Executive Council; functions as the Synod ad interim between meetings), and representatives of so-called "Historically Underrepresented Groups," such as racial minorities, the disabled, young adults, and gay and lesbian persons. Conference delegations larger than the minimum of three are required to have at least half their numbers be composed of lay people and, to the extent possible, include as many of the HUGs as previously described.

The chart below shows the moderators and assistant moderators, and the places of Synod meetings, since the United Church of Christ was founded on June 25, 1957. From that time until the 1961 General Synod, Synods had co-moderators, one each from the Congregational Christian Churches and the Evangelical and Reformed Church, since both bodies were still in existence during that period. On July 4, 1961, the UCC constitution and bylaws was declared in effect, and, until a 2013 revision, provided for a single moderator with two assistants. Beginning with the 30th Synod in 2015, moderators have had only one assistant.

== Moderators and Assistant Moderators of United Church of Christ General Synods ==
Number	Date	Place of Meeting	Moderator(s)	Assistant Moderator(s)
1st ("Uniting")	June 25–27, 1957	Cleveland, Ohio	The Rev. Louis W. Goebel, George B. Hastings	
2nd (regular)	July 5–9, 1959	Oberlin, Ohio	Frances Kapitzky, The Rev. Ray E. Phillips	
2nd (adjourned)	July 6–8, 1960	Cleveland, Ohio	Frances Kapitzky, The Rev. Ray E. Phillips	
3rd	July 3–7, 1961	Philadelphia, Pennsylvania	Mrs. George Kahlenberg, The Rev. Ernst Press	
4th	July 4–11, 1963	Denver, Colorado	The Hon. Donald Webber	The Rev. Stuart LeRoy Anderson, Mrs. Alfred C. Bartholomew
5th	July 1–7, 1965	Chicago, Illinois	The Rev. Gerhard W. Grauer	Elmo L. Fischer, Mrs. Robert C. Johnson
6th	June 22–29, 1967	Cincinnati, Ohio	Hollis F. Price	The Rev. George G. Parker, Mrs. Martin Burger
7th	June 25-July 2, 1969	Boston, Massachusetts	The Rev. Gibson I. Daniels	Mrs. Henry E. Hefty, Horace G. Ports
8th	June 25–29, 1971	Grand Rapids, Michigan	Richard C. Pfeiffer	Mrs. Thomas R. Wagner, The Rev. Theodore S. Ledbetter
9th	June 22–26, 1973	St. Louis, Missouri	The Rev. David G. Colwell	Manford Byrd, Jr., Velma M. Shotwell
10th	June 27-July 1, 1975	Minneapolis, Minnesota	The Hon. Margaret A. Haywood	Charles W. Elicker, The Rev. Louis H. Gunnemann
11th	July 1–5, 1977	Washington, D.C.	The Rev. Robert K. Nace	Erna Ballantine Bryant, Gary E. Mistlin
12th	June 22–26, 1979	Indianapolis, Indiana	Milton S. Hurst	The Rev. Donna Schaper, Dorothy B. Shimer
13th	June 27-July 1, 1981	Rochester, New York	The Rev. Nathaniel M. Guptill	The Hon. William Cousins, Jr., Virginia Held
14th	June 24–28, 1983	Pittsburgh, Pennsylvania	Helen I. Barnhill	Richard F. Boyer, The Rev. Carl F. Schroer
15th	June 27-July 2, 1985	Ames, Iowa	The Rev. John H. Krueger	Guy T. Outlaw, Janeece L. Dent
16th	June 25–30, 1987	Cleveland, Ohio	Kenneth P. Stewart	The Rev. G. Melvin Palmer, Aletha Kaohi
17th	June 29-July 4, 1989	Fort Worth, Texas	The Rev. Robert D. Sherard	David P. Gerth, Alida I. Millham
18th	June 27-July 2, 1991	Norfolk, Virginia	Charlotte Penfield Gosselink	Franklin W. Thomas, The Rev. John Rogers
19th	July 15–20, 1993	St. Louis, Missouri	The Rev. David Ruhe	Lilia L. Enriquez, William A. Malaski, Sr.
20th	June 29-July 4, 1995	Oakland, California	Victor Melendez	The Rev. Anthony L. Taylor, Donna J. Debney
21st	July 3–8, 1997	Columbus, Ohio	The Rev. David Dean	Margaret MacDonald, Frank Thomas
22nd	July 1–6, 1999	Providence, Rhode Island	The Hon. Denise Page Hood	The Rev. Jana Norman-Richardson, Robert B. Frieberg
23rd	July 13–17, 2001	Kansas City, Missouri	The Rev. Nancy S. Taylor	Richard M. Harter, M. Linda Jaramillo
24th	July 11–15, 2003	Minneapolis, Minnesota	Nathaniel A. Lewis, Jr.	The Rev. Chris Smith, Carol Wassmuth
25th	July 1–5, 2005	Atlanta, Georgia	The Rev. Norman W. Jackson	Annie Wynn Neal, Eric C. Smith
26th	June 22–26, 2007	Hartford, Connecticut	Merlyn Lawrence	The Rev. Elizabeth King, Kevin Manz
27th	June 26–30, 2009	Grand Rapids, Michigan	The Rev. Marvin L. Morgan	John Humphrey, Jane Tedder
28th	July 1–5, 2011	Tampa, Florida	James K. Robertson, Jr.	Caroline Belsom, Patricia Aurand
29th	June 28-July 2, 2013	Long Beach, California	The Rev. Elizabeth J. Tigner	Dale Bonds, The Hon. Brian Holeman
30th	June 26–30, 2015	Cleveland, Ohio	The Hon. Brian Holeman	The Rev. Susan E. Artt
31st	June 30-July 4, 2017	Baltimore, Maryland	The Rev. Susan E. Artt	Norman Williams
32nd	June 21-25, 2019	Milwaukee, Wisconsin	Norman Williams	The Rev. Penny Lowes
33rd ("Special Edition")	July 11-18, 2021	Virtual, because of COVID-19 pandemic (originally Kansas City, Missouri)	The Rev. Penny Lowes	Robert Sandman
34th	June 30-July 4, 2023	Indianapolis, Indiana	Robert Sandman	The Rev. A. Rushan Sinnaduray
35th	July 11-15, 2025	Kansas City, Missouri	The Rev. A. Rushan Sinnaduray	Jean Avison

== Sources ==
Past Constitutions and Bylaws of the United Church of Christ
Current UCC Constitution and Bylaws, as adopted on July 2, 2015
General Synod Minutes
