= Native American genocide in the United States =

Ethnic cleansing in the United States

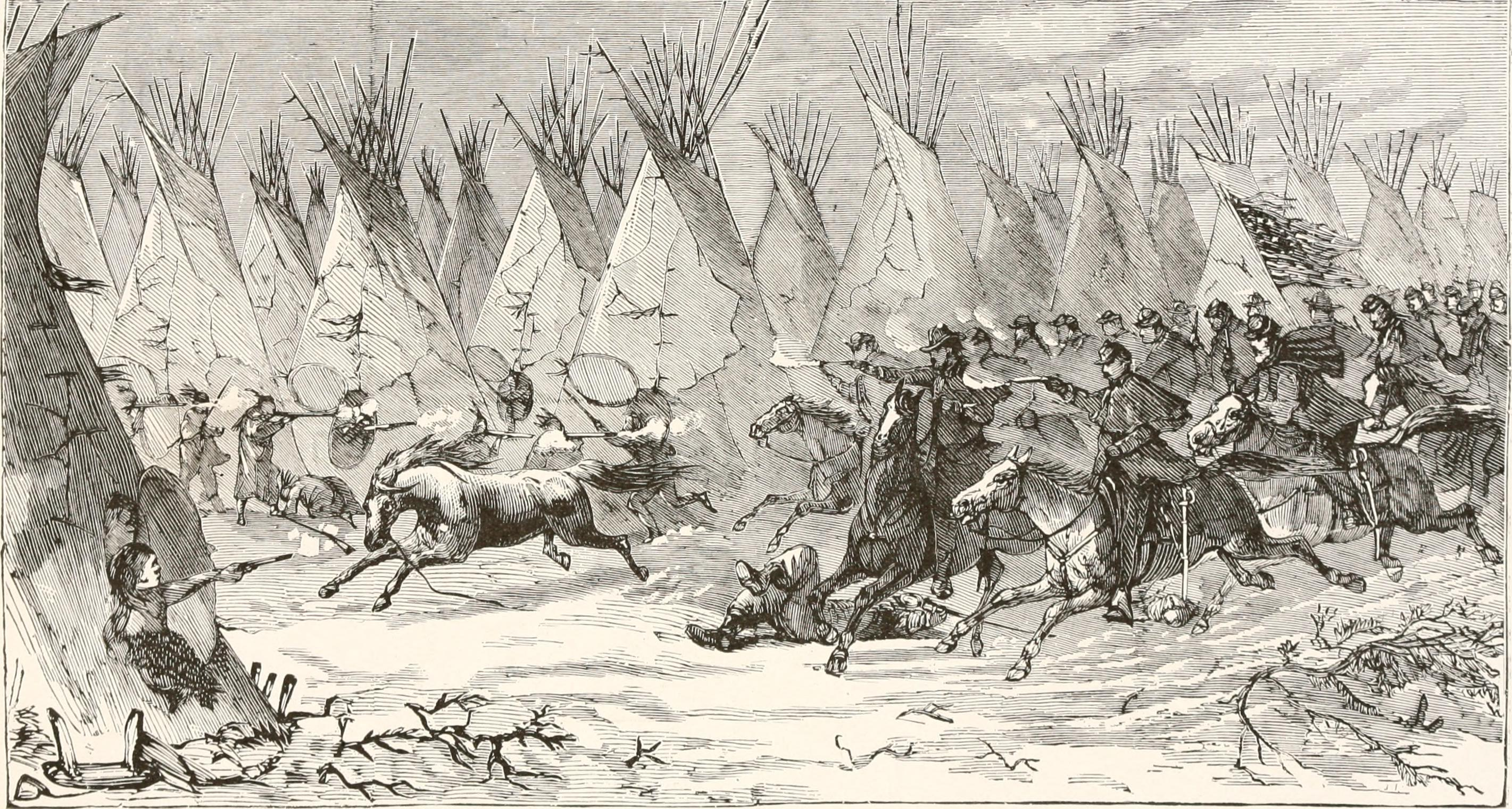
- 1919 illustration of a U.S. cavalry attack on a village
- Location: United States
- Date: 1492–1900s
- Target: Native Americans
- Attack type: Genocide, mass murder, biological warfare, forced displacement, ethnic cleansing, collective punishment, starvation, slavery, internment, genocidal rape, forced conversion, cultural genocide
- Deaths: ▼96% population drop (1492–1900) (Note: While estimates vary widely, historians, including Joan Marsh-Thornton, place the pre-1492 population of the present-day United States at around 5 million. The Native population in the U.S. reached its lowest point in 1900 at 237,000.); +4 million (est. 1492–1776); 350,000 (58% population decline from 1800 to 1890)
- Victim: 98% loss of ancestral homelands
- Perpetrators: European powers; British Empire (1585–1783); British Army, Colonial militias and British colonists; French Empire (1534–1803); French Royal Army, Colonial militias and French colonists; Spanish Empire (1540–1833); Spanish Royal Army, Colonial militias and Spanish colonists; North American states; First Mexican Empire (1833–1848); Mexican Armed Forces, Rurales and Mexican settlers; United States (1776–1900s); U.S. Armed Forces, state militias and settlers
- Motive: Settler colonialism; Religious discrimination; Eurocentrism; Anti-Native American racism; White supremacy; Manifest destiny

The destruction of Native American peoples, religions, cultures, and languages has been characterized by many as genocide. Debates are ongoing as to whether the entire process or only specific periods or events meet the definitions of genocide. Many of these definitions focus on intent, while others focus on outcomes. Raphael Lemkin, who coined the term "genocide", considered the displacement of Native Americans by European settlers as a historical example of genocide. While description as genocide has found increasing acceptance within Indigenous and genocide studies, mainstream scholarship on US and Native American history has largely rejected it, preferring to describe it as ethnic cleansing or certain events as genocidal.

Historians have long debated the pre-European population of the Americas. In 2023, historian Ned Blackhawk suggested that Northern America's population (including modern-day Canada and the United States) had halved from 1492 to 1776 from about 8 million people (all Native American in 1492) to under 4 million (predominantly white in 1776). Russell Thornton estimated that by 1800, some 600,000 Native Americans lived in the regions that would become the modern United States and declined to an estimated 250,000 by 1890 before rebounding.

The virgin soil thesis (VST), coined by historian Alfred W. Crosby, proposes that the population decline among Native Americans after 1492 is due to Native populations being immunologically unprepared for Old World diseases. While this theory continues to receive support in popular imagination and academia, recently, some scholars have argued that many Native American populations did not plummet after initial contact with Europeans, but only after violent interactions, including wars, removal, confinement to reservations and forced assimilation, and that these exacerbated the effects of disease.

The population decline among Native Americans after 1492 is attributed to various factors, including Eurasian diseases like influenza, pneumonic plagues, cholera, and smallpox. Additionally, conflicts, massacres, forced removal, enslavement, imprisonment, and warfare with European settlers significantly contributed to the reduction in populations and the disruption of traditional societies. Historian Jeffrey Ostler emphasizes the importance of considering the American Indian Wars, campaigns by the U.S. Army to subdue Native American nations in the American West starting in the 1860s, as genocide. Scholars increasingly refer to these events as massacres or "genocidal massacres", defined as the annihilation of a portion of a larger group, sometimes intended to send a message to the larger group.

Native American peoples have been subject to both historical and contemporary massacres along with acts of forced conversion and cultural genocide as their traditional ways of life were threatened by settlers. Colonial massacres and acts of ethnic cleansing explicitly sought to reduce Native populations and confine them to reservations. Forced conversion and cultural genocide was also deployed, in the form of displacement and appropriation of Indigenous knowledge, to weaken Native sovereignty. Native American peoples still face challenges stemming from colonialism, including settler occupation of their traditional homelands, police brutality, hate crimes, vulnerability to climate change, and mental health issues. Despite this, Native American resistance to colonialism and genocide has persisted, both in the past and the present.

== Background ==
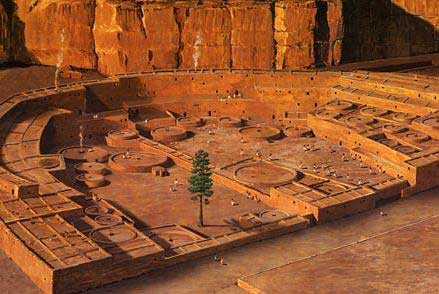
Chaco Canyon and the Pueblo Bonito (center), c. 828 BCE to c. 1126 CE, depicted in a 2007 NASA reconstruction

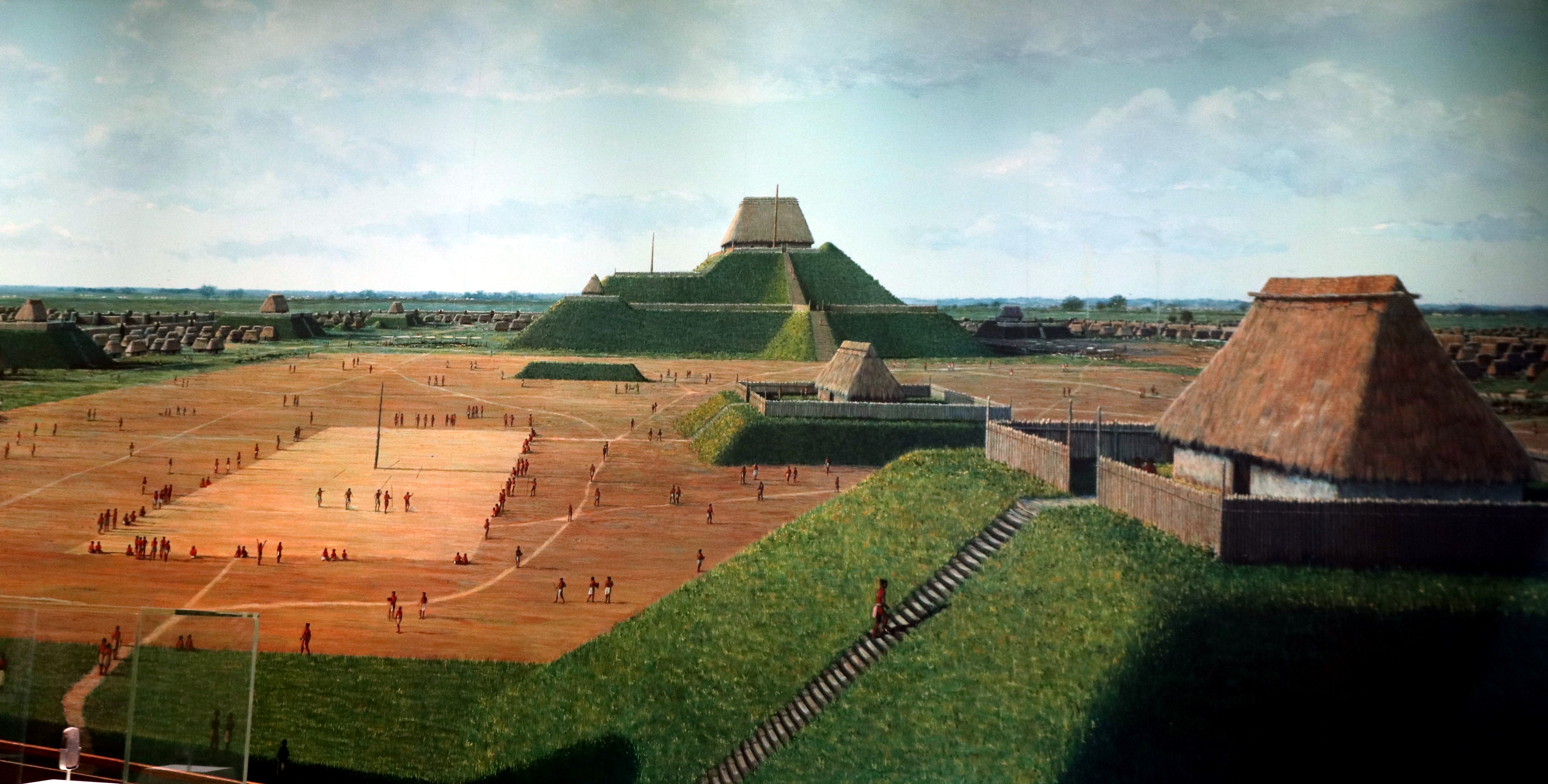
Illustration of Cahokia, the largest Mississippian culture city ruin, c. 1050 CE to c. 1350 CE

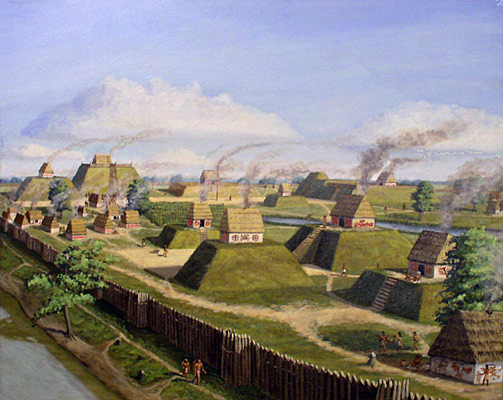
Artist's representation of the Kincaid site in Massac County, Illinois, c. 1050 CE to c. 1400 CE

Indian (Native American) tribes and linguistic stocks in 1650.

Population estimates for the pre-Columbian U.S. territory generally range from between 1 and 5 million people. Prominent cultures in the historical period before colonization included: Adena, Old Copper, Oasisamerica, Woodland, Fort Ancient, Hopewell tradition and Mississippian cultures.

In the classification of the archaeology of the Americas, the post-Classic stage is a term applied to some Precolumbian cultures, typically ending with local contact with Europeans. This stage is the fifth of five archaeological stages posited by Gordon Willey and Philip Phillips' 1958 book Method and Theory in American Archaeology. In the North American chronology, the "post-classic stage" followed the classic stage in certain areas, and typically dates from around AD 1200 to modern times.

The Indigenous peoples of the Pacific Northwest Coast were of many nations and tribal affiliations, each with distinctive cultural and political identities, but they shared certain beliefs, traditions, and practices, such as the centrality of salmon as a resource and spiritual symbol. Their gift-giving feast, potlatch, is a highly complex event where people gather to commemorate special events. These events include the raising of a totem pole or the appointment or election of a new chief. The most famous artistic feature of the culture is the totem pole, with carvings of animals and other characters to commemorate cultural beliefs, legends, and notable events.

The Mississippian culture was a mound-building Native American civilization that archaeologists date from approximately 800 CE to 1600 CE, varying regionally. It was composed of a series of urban settlements and satellite villages (suburbs) linked together by a loose trading network, the largest city being Cahokia, believed to be a major religious center. The civilization flourished in what is now the Midwestern, Eastern, and Southeastern United States.

Numerous pre-Columbian societies were urbanized, such as the Pueblo peoples, Mandan, and Hidatsa. The Iroquois League of Nations or "People of the Long House" was a politically advanced, democratic society, which is thought by some historians to have influenced the United States Constitution, with the Senate passing a resolution to this effect in 1988. Other historians have contested this interpretation and believe the impact was minimal, or did not exist, pointing to numerous differences between the two systems and the ample precedents for the constitution in European political thought.

Many Indigenous nations shared the belief of collective continuance and systems of responsibility with other humans and the non-human world. According to Citizen Potawatomi philosopher Kyle Powys Whyte, collective continuance refers to a society's ability to adapt to conditions to ensure community survival. Collective continuance begets the creation of systems of responsibility, in which individuals have a moral reciprocal relationship with the non-human world. The Oceti Sakowin belief of Mni Wiconi (water is life), for instance, describes a relationship in which the Missouri River nourishes their community, and they have a responsibility to protect it. The idea of collective continuance and systems of responsibility also extend into social structures. For example, for the Anishinaabe, gender was not binary, and women had more leadership roles that included responsibilities to others beyond their marriages.

== Colonial massacres ==
=== Attempted extermination of the Pequot ===
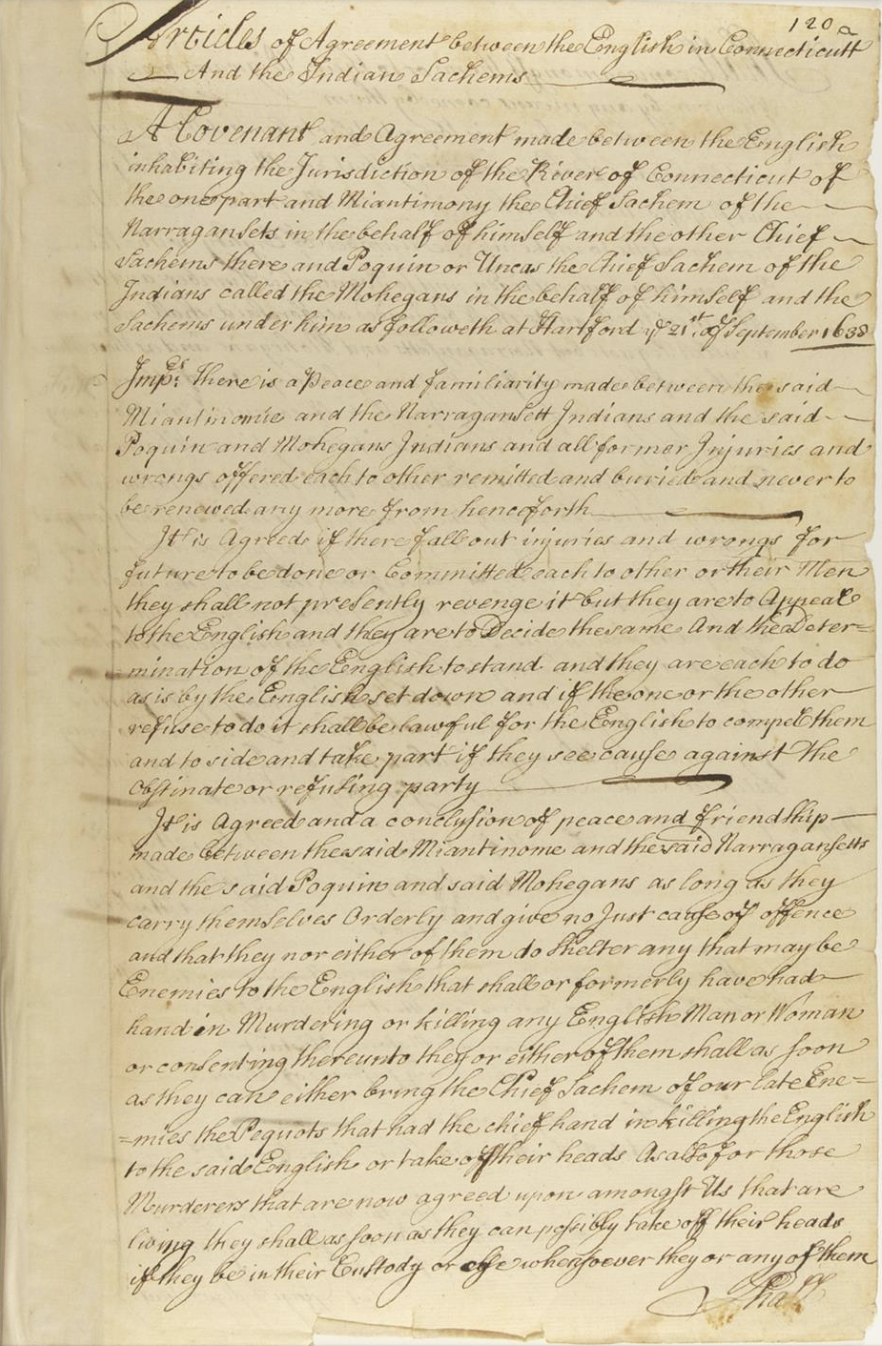
A 1743 copy of the Treaty of Hartford of 1638, through which English colonists sought to eradicate the Pequot cultural identity by prohibiting Pequot survivors of the war from returning to their lands, speaking their tribal language, or referring to themselves as Pequots.

The Pequot War was an armed conflict that took place between 1636 and 1638 in New England between the Pequot tribe and an alliance of the colonists of the Massachusetts Bay, Plymouth, and Saybrook colonies and their allies from the Narragansett and Mohegan tribes.

The war concluded with the decisive defeat of the Pequots. The colonies of Connecticut and Massachusetts offered bounties for the heads of killed hostile Indians, and later for just their scalps, during the Pequot War in the 1630s; Connecticut specifically reimbursed Mohegans for slaying the Pequot in 1637. At the end, about 700 Pequots had been killed or taken into captivity.

The English colonists imposed a harshly punitive treaty on the estimated 2,500 Pequots who survived the war; the Treaty of Hartford of 1638 sought to eradicate the Pequot cultural identity—with terms prohibiting the Pequots from returning to their lands, speaking their tribal language, or even referring to themselves as Pequots—and effectively dissolved the Pequot Nation, with many survivors executed or enslaved and sold away. Hundreds of prisoners were sold into slavery to the West Indies; other survivors were dispersed as captives to the victorious tribes. The result was the elimination of the Pequot tribe as a viable polity in Southern New England, the colonial authorities classifying them as extinct. However, members of the Pequot tribe still live today as a federally recognized tribe.

=== Massacre of the Narragansett people ===
The Great Swamp Massacre was committed during King Philip's War by colonial militia of New England on the Narragansett people in December 1675. On December 15 of that year, Narraganset warriors attacked the Jireh Bull Blockhouse and killed at least 15 people. Four days later, the militias from the English colonies of Plymouth, Connecticut, and Massachusetts Bay were led to the main Narragansett town in South Kingstown, Rhode Island. The settlement was burned, its inhabitants (including women and children) killed or evicted, and most of the tribe's winter stores destroyed. It is believed that at least 97 Narragansett warriors and 300 to 1,000 non-combatants were killed, though exact figures are unknown. The massacre was a critical blow to the Narragansett tribe during the period directly following the massacre. However, much like the Pequot, the Narragansett people continue to live today as a federally recognized tribe.

=== French and Indian War and Pontiac's War ===
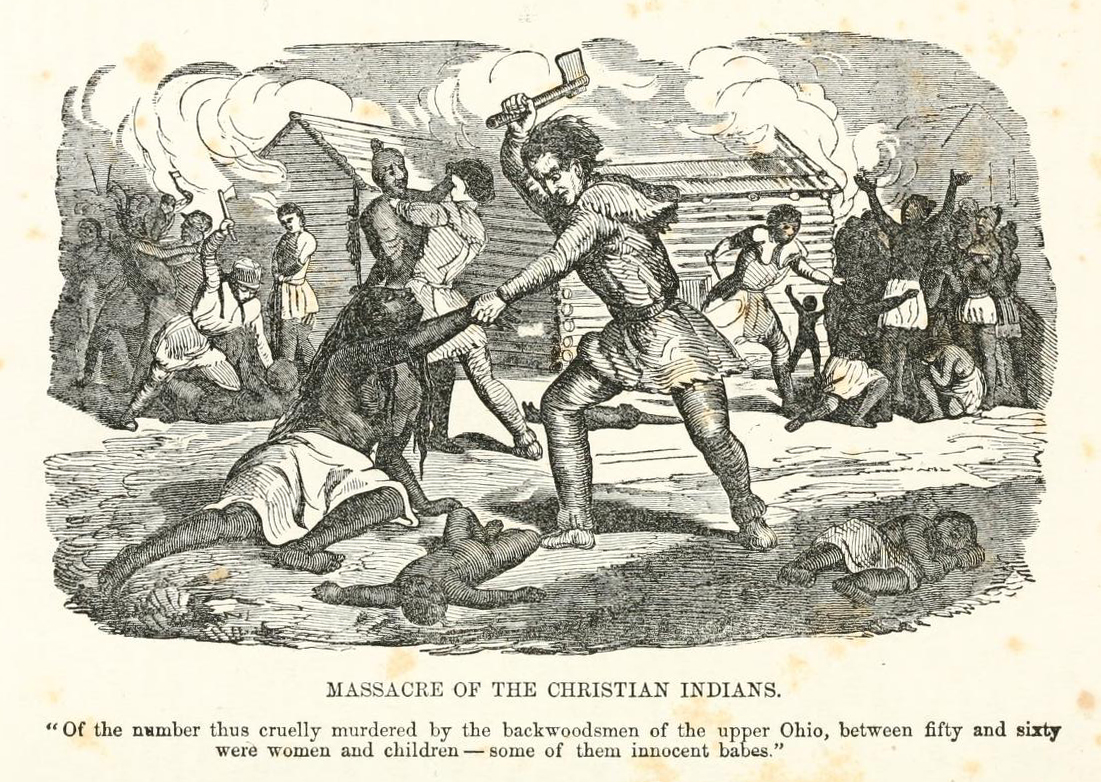
19th century engraving of the Gnadenhutten massacre

On June 12, 1755, during the French and Indian War, Massachusetts governor William Shirley issued a bounty of £40 for a male Indian scalp, and £20 for scalps of Indian females or of children under 12 years old. In 1756, Pennsylvania lieutenant-governor Robert Hunter Morris, in his declaration of war against the Lenni Lenape (Delaware) people, offered "130 Pieces of Eight, for the Scalp of Every Male Indian Enemy, above the Age of Twelve Years", and "50 Pieces of Eight for the Scalp of Every Indian Woman, produced as evidence of their being killed." During Pontiac's War, Colonel Henry Bouquet conspired with his superior, Sir Jeffrey Amherst, to infect hostile Native Americans through biological warfare with smallpox blankets.

== Ethnic cleansing ==
=== Sullivan Expedition ===
Near the beginning of the Revolutionary War, the British Army and Native American allies staged attacks on frontier towns in the Mohawk Valley region of New York. To resolve this issue, George Washington ordered the Continental Army, under the command of John Sullivan and James Clinton, to conduct a series of scorched earth campaigns against the four British-allied nations of the Iroquois Confederacy. Washington's orders followed an initial assault against the Haudenosaunee where Colonel Van Schaik burned two Onondaga villages. In May 1779, Washington wrote, "The expedition you are appointed to command is to be directed against the hostile tribes of the six nations of Indians, with their associates and adherents. The immediate objects are the total destruction and devastation of their settlements and the capture of as many prisoners of every age and sex as possible. It will be essential to ruin their crops now in the ground and prevent their planting more."

Sullivan and Clinton's troops reportedly burned over forty settlements and hundreds of acres of crops, as well as an estimated 160,000 bushels of corn. Despite this, Sullivan failed to capture a sizable number of prisoners, and did not achieve the original goal of invading the British base at Fort Niagara. The Continental Army also failed to completely dispel threats from the Haudenosaunee. In fact, attacks against frontier towns increased after the expedition, as the Haudenosaunee pursued revenge. Historian Joseph R. Fischer has called the expedition a "well-executed failure." Although the expedition's goal of eliminating Native populations was not met, the Haudenosaunee still faced hardship as many lost their livelihoods and were displaced from their homes.

The Sullivan Expedition has been memorialized by American settlers in what historical anthropologist A. Lynn Smith calls the "Sullivan commemorative complex." Smith refers to monuments, markers, and places bearing the name of the expedition as a celebration of colonialism and domination, and she argues that they affect how local residents relate to their past. Smith shows that Haudenosaunee populations are harmed by this commemorative complex that pinpoints the sites of destruction on their ancestral lands and seeks to replace Native memory. Many people, both Native and non-Native, disapprove of these commemorative markers, and various activists and organizations seek to get markers removed and reveal the reality of the Expedition.

=== Manifest destiny ===
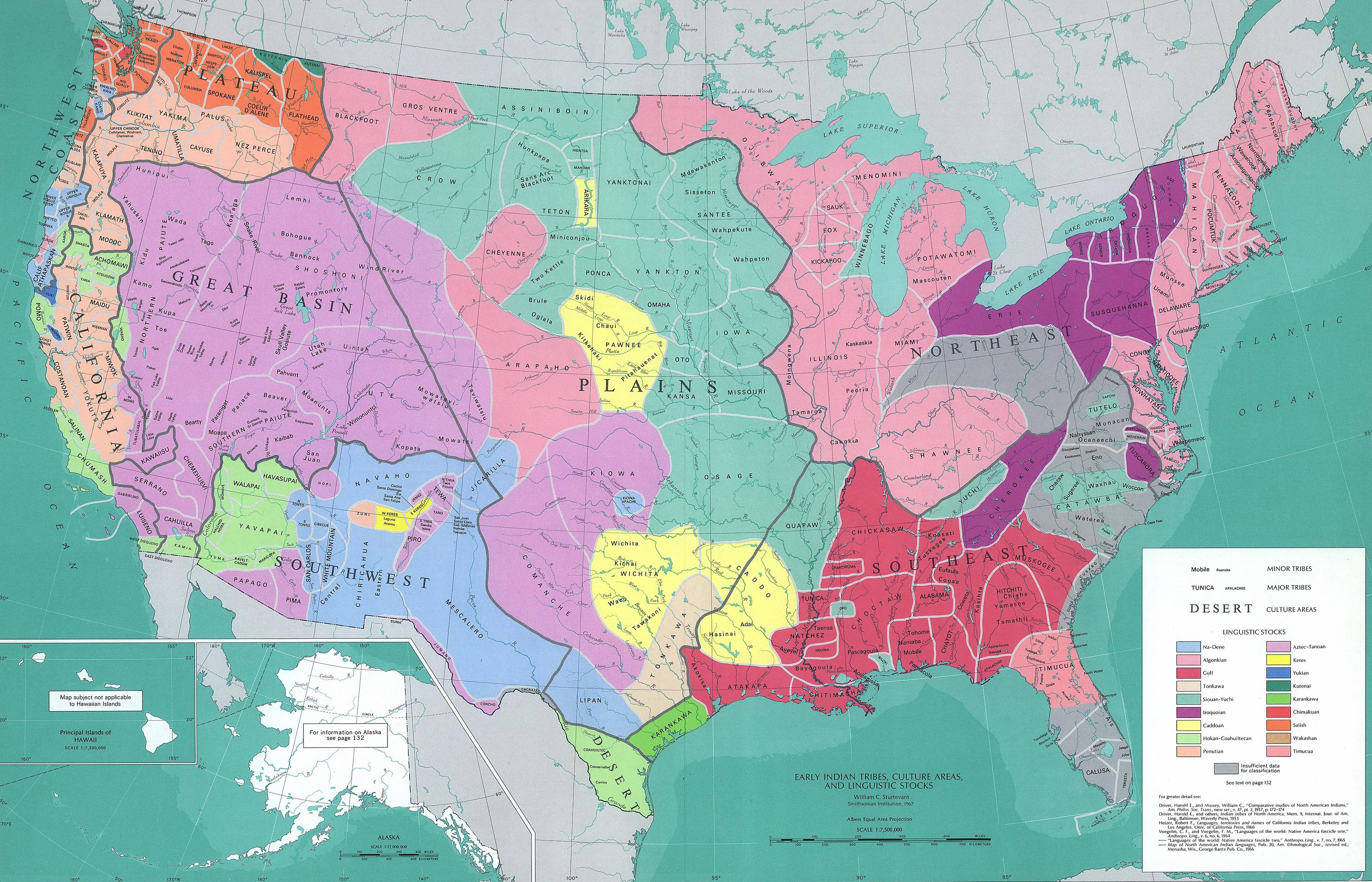
Early Native American tribal territories color-coded by linguistic group

Manifest destiny had serious consequences for Native Americans, since continental expansion implicitly meant the occupation and annexation of Native American land, sometimes to expand slavery. This ultimately led to confrontations and wars with several groups of native peoples via Indian removal. The United States continued the European practice of recognizing only limited land rights of Indigenous peoples. In a policy formulated largely by Henry Knox, Secretary of War in the Washington administration, the U.S. government sought to expand into the west through the purchase of Native American land in treaties.

The United States justified manifest destiny with the Doctrine of Discovery, a fifteenth century international law developed by the Catholic Church. Three landmark Supreme Court cases, the Marshall Trilogy, invoked the Doctrine of Discovery to declare that Native Americans were domestic dependent Nations and only had limited sovereignty on their own land.

Only the federal government could purchase Indian lands, and this was done through treaties with tribal leaders. Whether a tribe actually had a decision-making structure capable of making a treaty was a controversial issue. The national policy was for the Indians to join American society and become "civilized", which meant no more wars with neighboring tribes or raids on white settlers or travelers, and a shift from hunting to farming and ranching. Advocates of civilization programs believed that the process of settling native tribes would greatly reduce the amount of land needed by the Native Americans, making more land available for homesteading by white Americans. Thomas Jefferson believed that the Indigenous people of America had to assimilate and live like the whites or inevitably be pushed aside by them. Once Jefferson believed that assimilation was no longer possible, he advocated for the extermination or displacement of Indigenous people. Following the forced removal of many Indigenous peoples, Americans increasingly believed that Native American ways of life would eventually disappear as the United States expanded. Humanitarian advocates of removal believed that American Indians would be better off moving away from whites.

As historian Reginald Horsman argued in his influential study Race and Manifest Destiny, racial rhetoric increased during the era of manifest destiny. Americans increasingly believed that Native American ways of life would "fade away" as the United States expanded. As an example, this idea was reflected in the work of one of America's first great historians, Francis Parkman, whose landmark book The Conspiracy of Pontiac was published in 1851. Parkman wrote that after the French defeat in the French and Indian War, Indians were "destined to melt and vanish before the advancing waves of Anglo-American power, which now rolled westward unchecked and unopposed". Parkman emphasized that the collapse of Indian power in the late 18th century had been swift and was a past event.

While some literary works, like those of James Fenimore Cooper, portrayed Native Americans positively, others did not: Mark Twain, for example, was overwhelmingly negative in his characterizations, and seeking to counter the trope of the "Noble Aborigine" in 1870 went so far as to write that the "Noble Red Man" was "[...] nothing but a poor filthy, naked scurvy vagabond, whom to exterminate were a charity to the Creator's worthier insects and reptiles which he oppresses".

=== Trail of Tears ===
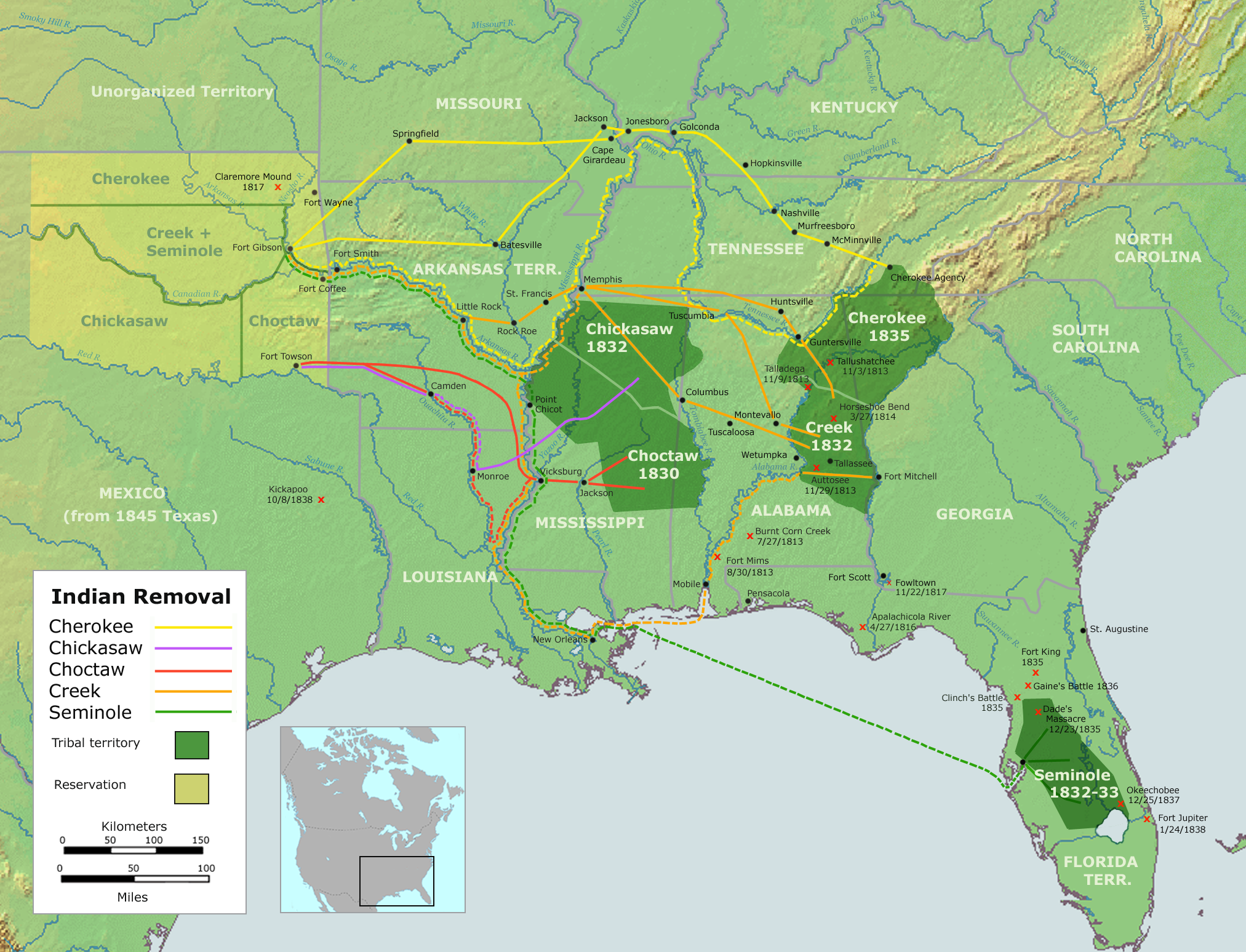
Graphic depicting Trail of Tears

The Trail of Tears was an ethnic cleansing and forced displacement of approximately 60,000 people of the "Five Civilized Tribes" between 1830 and 1850 by the United States government. As part of the Indian removal, members of the Cherokee, Muscogee (Creek), Seminole, Chickasaw, and Choctaw nations were forcibly removed from their ancestral homelands in the Southeastern United States to newly designated Indian Territory west of the Mississippi River after the passage of the Indian Removal Act in 1830. The Cherokee removal in 1838 (the last forced removal east of the Mississippi) was brought on by the discovery of gold near Dahlonega, Georgia, in 1828, resulting in the Georgia Gold Rush. The relocated peoples suffered from exposure, disease, and starvation while en route to their newly designated Indian reserve. Thousands, made vulnerable by removal, died from disease before reaching their destinations or shortly after. Some historians have said that the event constituted a genocide, although this label remains a matter of debate.

Chalk and Jonassohn assert that the deportation of the Cherokee tribe along the Trail of Tears would almost certainly be considered an act of genocide today. The Indian Removal Act of 1830 led to the exodus. About 17,000 Cherokees, along with approximately 2,000 Cherokee-owned black slaves, were removed from their homes. Historians such as David Stannard and Barbara Mann have noted that the army deliberately routed the march of the Cherokee to pass through areas of a known cholera epidemic, such as Vicksburg, Mississippi. Stannard estimates that during the forced removal from their homelands, following the Indian Removal Act signed into law by President Andrew Jackson in 1830, 8,000 Cherokee died, about half the total population.

=== Indiana ===
Throughout the first half of the 19th century, several Native American groups such as the Potawatomi and Miami were expelled from their homelands in Indiana under the Indian Removal Act. The Potawatomi Trail of Death alone led to the deaths of over 40 individuals.

=== Long Walk ===
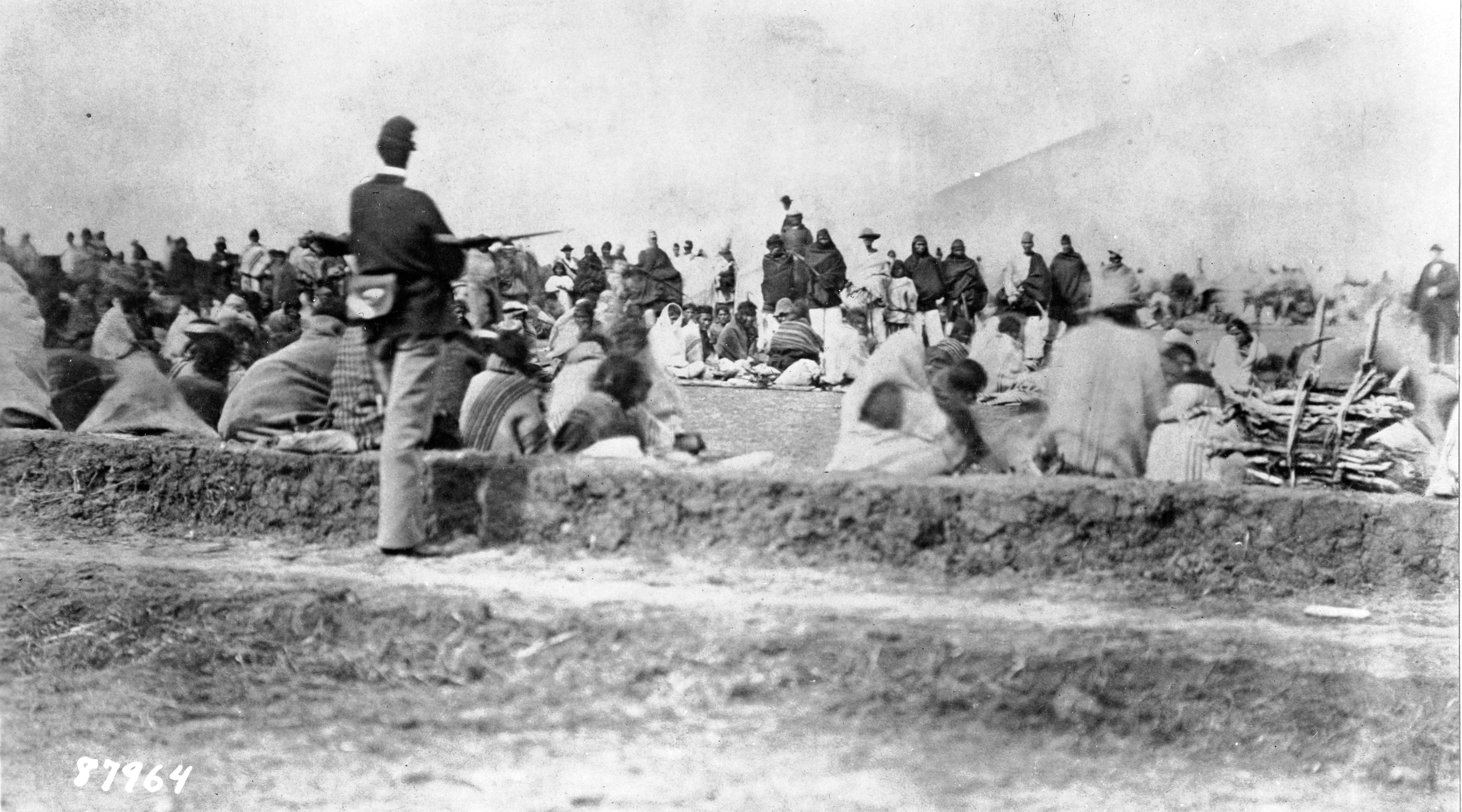
A U.S. soldier stands guard over Navajo people during the Long Walk.

The Long Walk of the Navajo, also called the Long Walk to Bosque Redondo (Navajo: Hwéeldi), was the 1864 deportation and ethnic cleansing of the Navajo people by the United States federal government. Navajos were forced to walk from their land in western New Mexico Territory (modern-day Arizona) to Bosque Redondo in eastern New Mexico. Some 53 different forced marches occurred between August 1864 and the end of 1866. Some anthropologists claim that the "collective trauma of the Long Walk [is] critical to contemporary Navajos' sense of identity as a people".

=== Yavapai Exodus ===
In 1886, many of the Yavapai ethnic group joined in campaigns by the US Army, as scouts, against Geronimo and other Chiricahua Apache. The wars ended with the Yavapai's and the Tonto's removal from the Camp Verde Reservation to San Carlos on February 27, 1875, now known as Exodus Day. 1,400 where relocated in these travels and over the course the relocation the Yavapai received no wagons or rest stops. Yavapai were beaten with whips through rivers of melted snow in which many drowned, any Yavapai who lagged behind was left behind or shot. The march lead to 375 deaths.

=== Reservation system ===
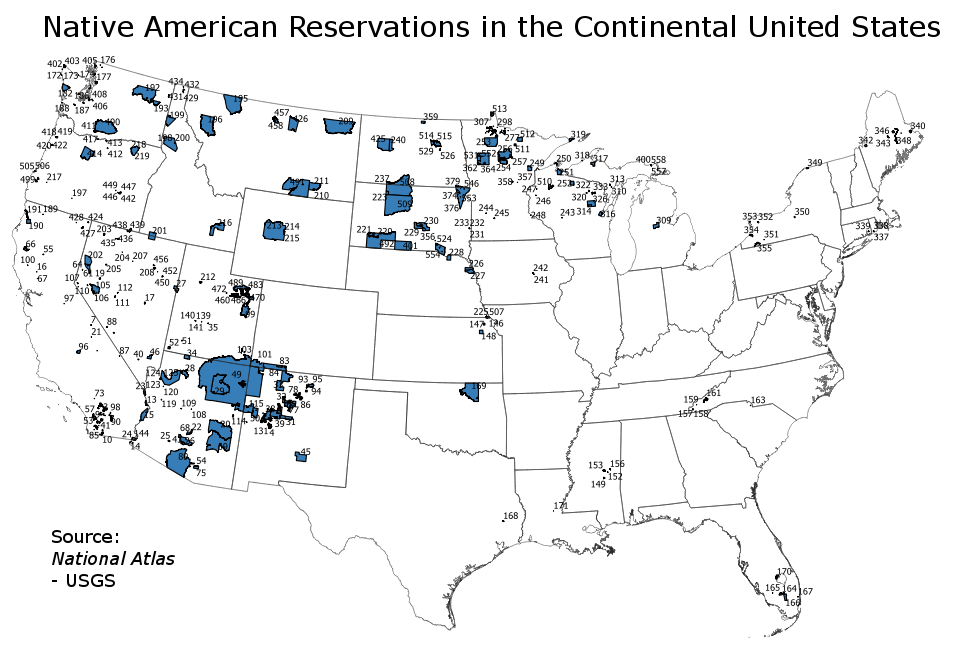
Reservations in the Continental United States

Indian removal policies led to the current day reservation system which allocated territories to individual tribes. According to scholar Dina Gilio-Whitaker, "the treaties also created reservations that would confine Native people into smaller territories far smaller than they had for millennia been accustomed to, diminishing their ability to feed themselves." According to author and scholar David Rich Lewis, these reservations had much higher population densities than indigenous homelands. As a result, "the consolidation of native peoples in the 19th century allowed epidemic diseases to rage through their communities." In addition to this "a result of changing subsistence patterns and environments-contributed to an explosion of dietary-related illness like diabetes, vitamin and mineral deficiencies, cirrhosis, obesity, gallbladder disease, hypertension, and heart disease".

Once their territories were incorporated into the United States, surviving Native Americans were denied equality before the law and often treated as wards of the state. Many Native Americans were moved to reservations—constituting 4% of U.S. territory. In a number of cases, treaties signed with Native Americans were violated. Tens of thousands of American Indians and Alaska Natives were forced to attend a residential school system which sought to reeducate them in white-settler American values, culture, and economy.

Oceti Sakowin historian Nick Estes has called reservations "prisoner of war camps," citing forced removal and confinement. Reservations have historically had negative ecological effects on Native communities. The reservation system "offset the flourishing moral relationships that supported" Indigenous communities' resilience to changing environmental conditions. For instance, Whyte explains that being confined to a reservation jeopardizes Native communities' relationships with plants and animals located outside the scope of the reservation. Reservations also limit space for ceremonial practices and harvesting, and disrupt traditional seasonal rounds, which allowed Indigenous people to adapt to their environments.

Despite being forced onto reservations, Native Americans' right to that land and historical territory is not secured. Governments and private companies often take control of Indigenous land, or they use the reservation system to justify the control of Indigenous land that does not fall within the reservation. The Dakota Access Pipeline, for instance, cuts through ancestral Oceti Sakowin land, but historical dispossession then makes it seem to settlers that the pipeline today does not require Indigenous consent since it is off reservation. The Army Corps of Engineers has also taken Native land in Minnesota to construct a power plant, while waste sites are often placed close to reservations. House Concurrent Resolution 108, passed in 1953, attempted to withdraw federal protection of tribal lands and dissolve reservations. Many Native Americans were then relocated to cities. According to Kyle Powys Whyte, since the creation of the reservation system, "settlers eventually 'filled in' treaty areas and reservation areas with their own private property and government lands, which limit where and when Indigenous peoples can harvest, monitor, store and honor animals and plants... settler discourses cast Indigenous harvesters and gatherers as violating the 'law,' among many other types of stigmatizations." In June 2022, the Supreme Court ruled in Oklahoma v. Castro-Huerta that Oklahoma has jurisdiction over Native reservations when a non-Native commits a crime against a Native. This contemporary decision further weakened Native control over their own reservation lands.

== Genocidal campaigns ==
Stacie Martin states that the United States has not been legally admonished by the international community for genocidal acts against its Indigenous population, but many historians and academics describe events such as the Mystic massacre, the Trail of Tears, the Sand Creek massacre and the Mendocino War as genocidal in nature.

The non-Native historian Roxanne Dunbar-Ortiz states that U.S. history, as well as inherited Indigenous trauma, cannot be understood without dealing with the genocide that the United States committed against Indigenous peoples. From the colonial period through the founding of the United States and continuing in the twentieth century, this has entailed torture, terror, sexual abuse, massacres, systematic military occupations, removals of Indigenous peoples from their ancestral territories via Indian removal policies, forced removal of Native American children to boarding schools, allotment, and a policy of termination.

The letters exchanged between Bouquet and Amherst during the Pontiac War show Amherst writing to Bouquet that the indigenous people needed to be exterminated: "You will do well to try to inoculate the Indians by means of blankets, as well as to try every other method that can serve to extirpate this execrable race." Historians regard this as evidence of a genocidal intent by Amherst, as well as part of a broader genocidal attitude frequently displayed against Native Americans during the colonization of the Americas. When smallpox swept the northern plains of the U.S. in 1837, the U.S. Secretary of War Lewis Cass ordered that no Mandan (along with the Arikara, the Cree, and the Blackfeet) be given smallpox vaccinations, which were provided to other tribes in other areas.

Historian Jeffrey Ostler describes the Colorado territorial militia's slaughter of Cheyennes at Sand Creek (1864) and the army's slaughter of Shoshones at Bear River (1863), Blackfeet on the Marias River (1870), and Lakotas at Wounded Knee (1890) as "genocidal massacres".

=== California ===
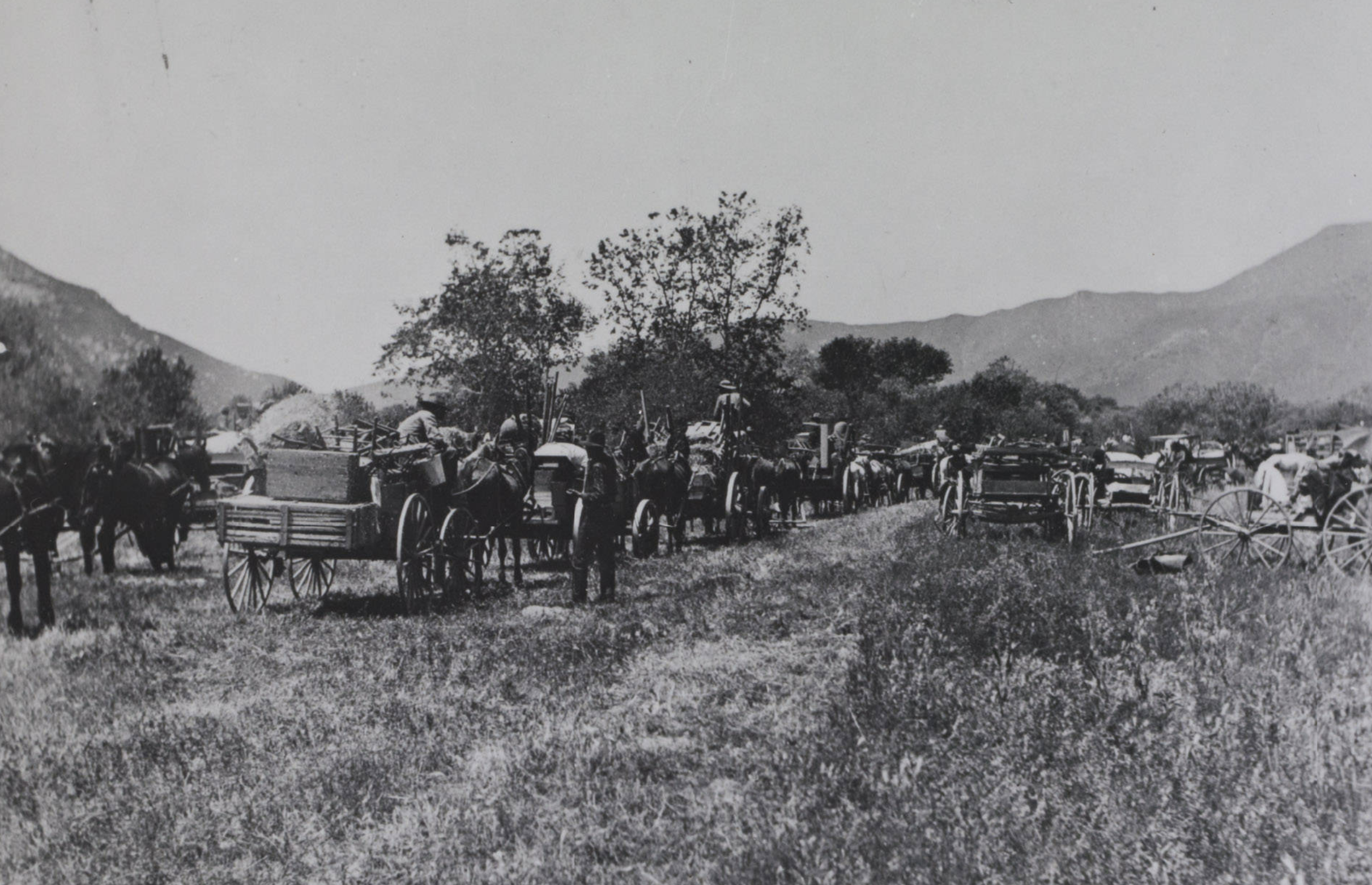
Population transfer of the Cupeño.

The U.S. colonization of California started in earnest in 1846, with the Mexican–American War. With the 1848 Treaty of Guadalupe Hidalgo, it gave the United States authority over 525,000 square miles of new territory. Following the Gold Rush, there were a number of killings and state-subsidized massacres by settlers against Native Americans in the territory, causing several ethnic groups to be nearly wiped out. In one such series of conflicts, the so-called Mendocino War and the subsequent Round Valley War, the entirety of the Yuki people was brought to the brink of extinction. From a previous population of some 6,800 people, fewer than 300 members of the Yuki tribe were left.

The pre-Columbian population of California was around 300,000. By 1849, due to epidemics, the number had decreased to 100,000. But from 1849 to 1870 the indigenous population of California had fallen to 35,000 because of killings and displacement. At least 4,500 California Indians were killed between 1849 and 1870, while many more were weakened and perished due to disease and starvation. 10,000 Indians were also kidnapped and sold as slaves. In a speech before representatives of Native American peoples in June 2019, California governor Gavin Newsom apologized for the genocide. Newsom said, "That's what it was, a genocide. No other way to describe it. And that's the way it needs to be described in the history books."

Whites hunted down adult Indians in the mountains, kidnapped their children, and sold them as apprentices for as little as $50. Indians could not complain in court because of a California statute that stated that 'no Indian or Black or Mulatto person was permitted to give evidence in favor of or against a white person'. One contemporary wrote, "The miners are sometimes guilty of the most brutal acts with the Indians... such incidents have fallen under my notice that would make humanity weep and men disown their race". The towns of Marysville and Honey Lake paid bounties for Indian scalps. Shasta City authorities offered $5 for every Indian head brought to them.

=== American Indian wars ===
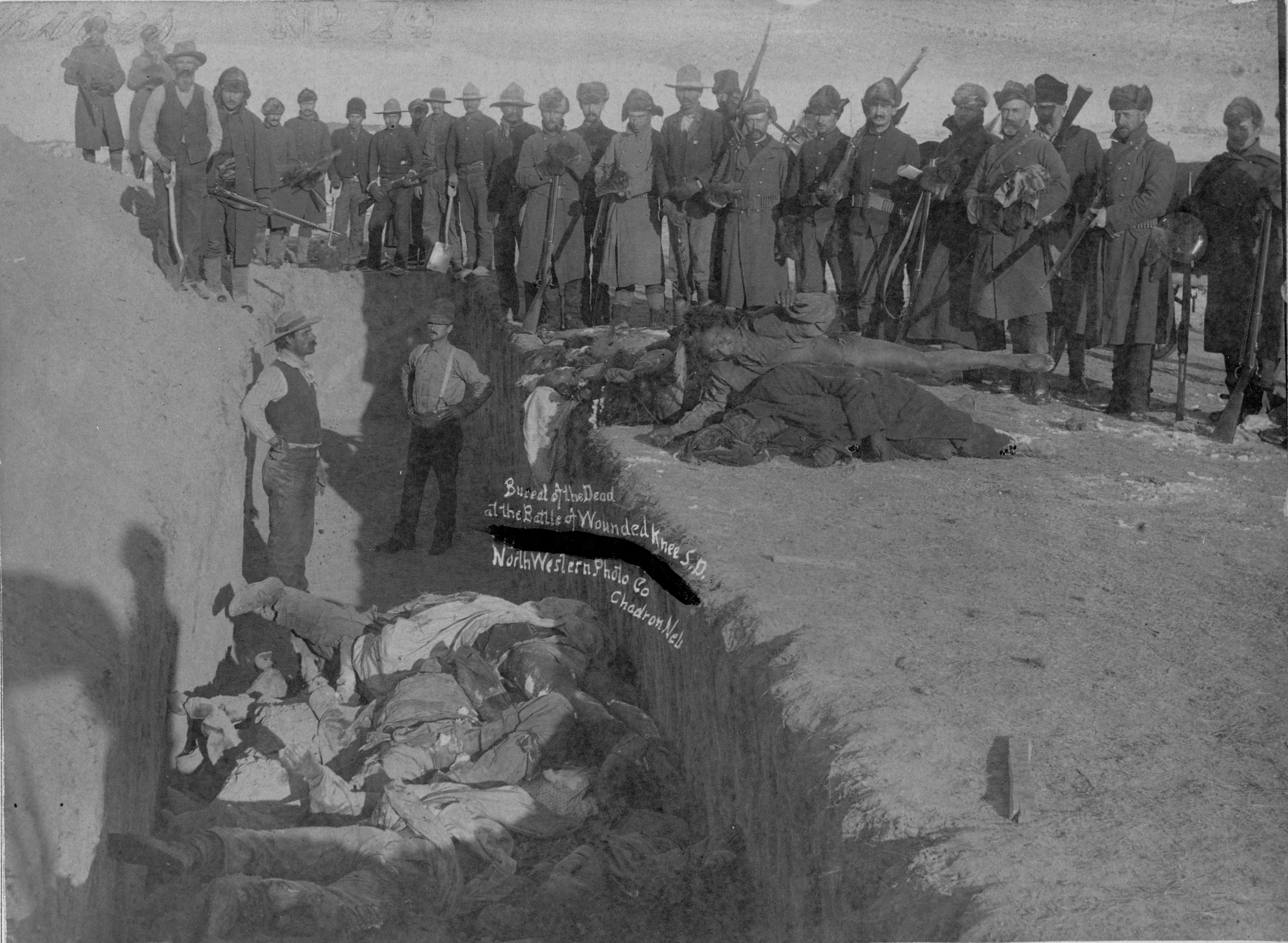
A mass grave being dug for frozen bodies from the 1890 Wounded Knee massacre, in which the U.S. Army killed 150 Lakota people, marking the end of the American Indian Wars

During the Indian Wars, the American Army carried out a number of massacres and forced relocations of Indigenous peoples that are sometimes considered genocide. Jeffrey Ostler, the Beekman Professor of Northwest and Pacific History at the University of Oregon, stated the American Indian War "was genocidal war". Xabier Irujo, professor of genocide studies at the University of Nevada, Reno, stated, "the toll on human lives in the wars against the native nations between 1848 and 1881 was horrific." Notable conflicts in this period include the Dakota War, Great Sioux War, Comanche campaign, Snake War and Colorado War. These conflicts occurred in the United States from the time of the earliest colonial settlements in the 17th century until the end of the 19th century. The wars resulted from several factors, the most common being the desire of settlers and governments for Indian tribes' lands.

The 1864 Sand Creek massacre, which caused outrage in its own time, has been regarded as a genocide. Colonel John Chivington led a 700-man force of Colorado Territory militia in a massacre of 70–163 peaceful Cheyenne and Arapaho, about two-thirds of whom were women, children, and infants. Chivington and his men took scalps and other body parts as trophies, including human fetuses and male and female genitalia. Chivington stated, "Damn any man who sympathizes with Indians! ... I have come to kill Indians, and believe it is right and honorable to use any means under God's heaven to kill Indians. ... Kill and scalp all, big and little; nits make lice."

== Forced conversion and cultural genocide ==
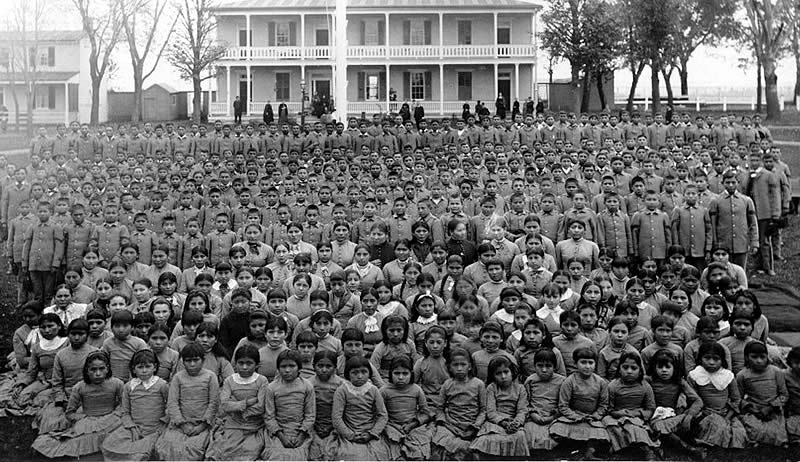
Pupils at the Carlisle Indian Industrial School, Pennsylvania (c. 1900).

In reference to colonialism in the United States, Raphael Lemkin stated that the "colonial enslavement of American Indians was a cultural genocide." He also stated that colonialism in the United States comprised an "effective and thorough method of destroying a culture and de-socializing human beings". Lemkin drew a distinction between "cultural change and cultural genocide". He defined the former as a slow and gradual process of transition to new situations, and he saw the latter as the result of a radical and violent change that necessitated "the pre-meditated goal of those committing cultural genocide". Lemkin believed that cultural genocide occurs only when there are "surgical operations on cultures and deliberate assassinations of civilizations".

Historian Patrick Wolfe coined the term "logic of elimination" to describe the "relationship between genocide and the settler-colonial tendency." He points to the racialization of Native Americans and the proliferation of blood quantum laws as a means to reduce Native populations and further the logic of elimination. Wolfe also describes the non-physical nature of the logic of elimination and the way it is carried out, claiming that "officially encouraged miscegenation, the breaking-down of native title into alienable individual freeholds, native citizenship, child abduction, religious conversion, resocialization in total institutions such as missions or boarding schools, and a whole range of cognate biocultural assimilations" all facilitated colonial settlement.

According to Vincent Schilling, many people are aware of historical atrocities that were committed against his people, but there is an "extensive amount of misunderstanding about Native American and First Nations people's history." He added that Native Americans have also suffered a "cultural genocide" because of colonization's residual effects.

The American-Indian experience in North America is defined as comprising physical and cultural disintegration. That fact becomes clear when one examines how law and colonialism were used as tools of genocide, both physically and culturally. According to Luana Ross the assumption that law (a Euro-American construct) and its administration are prejudiced against particular groups of individuals is critical for understanding Native American criminality and the experiences of Natives imprisoned. For instance, in Georgia, the 1789 act permitted indiscriminate massacre of Creek Indians by proclaiming them to be outside the state's protection. Apart from physical annihilation, the State promoted acculturation by introducing legislation limiting land entitlements to Indians who had abandoned tribal citizenship.

Throughout the writing of the Genocide Convention, the United States was adamantly opposed to the addition of cultural genocide, even threatening to block the treaty's approval if cultural genocide was included in the final text.

=== Forced assimilation ===
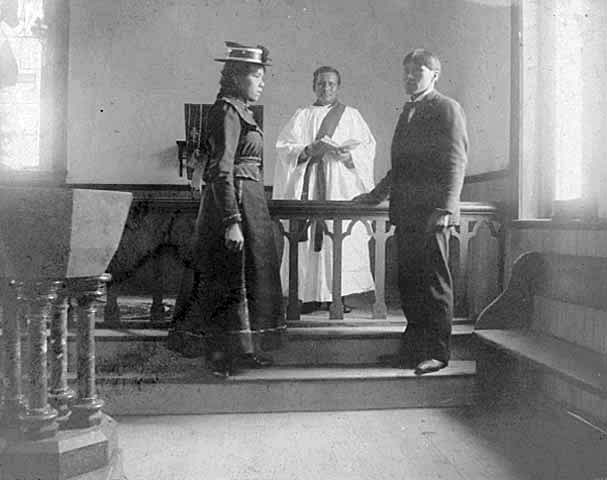
Young woman and young man standing at a church altar with a priest

The Native American boarding school system was a 150-year program and federal policy that separated Indigenous children from their families and sought to assimilate them into white society. It began in the early 19th century, coinciding with the start of Indian Removal policies. A Federal Indian Boarding School Initiative Investigative Report was published on May 11, 2022, which officially acknowledged the federal government's role in creating and perpetuating this system. According to the report, the U.S. federal government operated or funded more than 408 boarding institutions in 37 states between 1819 and 1969. 431 boarding schools were identified in total, many of which were run by religious institutions.

The report described the system as part of a federal policy aimed at eradicating the identity of Indigenous communities and confiscating their lands. Abuse was widespread at the schools, as was overcrowding, malnutrition, disease and lack of adequate healthcare, all of which worsened the effect of disease. The report documented over 500 child deaths at 19 schools, although it is estimated the total number could rise to thousands, and possibly even tens of thousands. Marked or unmarked burial sites were discovered at 53 schools. The school system has been described as a cultural genocide and a racist dehumanization.

=== Displacement ===
The ecological effects of displacement and relocation have threatened Native Americans' ability to perform traditional cultural practices. For instance, at the turn of the 20th century, "one strategy of settler colonialism was to consolidate mobile family groups to sedentary villages with central nodes, such as a post office, government school and a mission." Various Indigenous nations are historically ecologically mobile, and according to Kyle Powys Whyte, they have "adaptive cultural and political systems and institutions that are tightly coupled with certain ecological conditions." Settler efforts to contain Natives not only removed them from these culturally significant environmental contexts, but also increased their vulnerability to climate change by impeding their ability to adapt to its impacts. For nations that were not historically mobile, displacement and relocation presented challenges as well, as introduction to unfamiliar land "compromised the mental, physical, and community health of Indigenous peoples, thus escalating mortality rates." The destruction of land and relocation to new land also undermined "Indigenous knowledge systems and Indigenous peoples' capacity to cultivate landscapes and adjust to environmental change," or, what Whyte calls collective continuance. Collective continuance depends on a community's ability to carry out interdepend relationships and systems of responsibilities with all life forms. Colonial ecological violence, known as "a unique form of violence perpetrated by the settler-colonial state, private industry, and settler-colonial culture as a whole," harmed ecosystems, threatened Indigenous self-determination, and prevented these communities from living as they had for millennia.

=== Appropriation of knowledge ===
Indigenous systems of knowledge and science have historically been undervalued by Western science. In recent decades as awareness of the climate crisis rises, this knowledge has been appropriated by settlers. Scholar Jaskiran Dhillon argues that while the state has traditionally disregarded Indigenous scientists, there is now "state-driven 'discovery' of Indigenous knowledge." This co-optation extracts only certain information from Indigenous knowledge systems to aid climate adaptation for settler societies. According to Dhillon, non-Native environmental scholars often advocate the integration of Indigenous environmental knowledge into mainstream science, but do not adopt an environmental justice approach. Despite extracting from Indigenous knowledge, the state does not center decolonization and Indigenous identity, resulting in the appropriation of Native American science.

Environmental sociologist J.M. Bacon states that "the bulk of the dominant culture's knowledge about Native peoples comes from sources that are not Native-made." These narratives about Indigenous knowledge draw on Native stories and imagery to perpetuate the noble savage concept and "obscure both the historic events related to colonization and the ongoing occupation of Native lands." Dhillon agrees, claiming that epistemology that truly integrates Indigenous knowledge will "challenge dominant, colonial, and Eurocentric knowledge systems. According to Deborah McGregor, an Anishinaabe scholar, the dominant Eurocentric approach to traditional Indigenous knowledge does not reflect Indigenous concepts of moral relationships, but instead sustains colonial views of Natives. The appropriation of Indigenous knowledge fails to recognize the validity of Native American science and perpetuates the colonial system that continues to oppress Native peoples.

== Contemporary issues ==
=== Environmental issues and Climate change ===
According to the 2024 United States National Climate Assessment, Indigenous peoples face a "loss of traditional knowledge in the face of rapidly changing ecological conditions, increased food insecurity...changing water availability, Arctic Sea ice loss, permafrost thaw, and relocation from historic homeland." Whyte highlights the compound vulnerability theory in which there are three areas that Indigenous peoples and those in the Global South are more vulnerable to climate change: geography, economy, and lack of historical responsibility. Whyte maintains that this popular approach does not account for colonialism, which is key factor of environmental justice and cause of climate change. According to Whyte, increased vulnerability to climate change for Indigenous peoples "results from colonial strategies that sought to missionise, educate, and render sedentary Indigenous peoples...replacing the Indigenous institutions with settler ones." Many climate change policies that do not address colonialism harm Native Americans and Indigenous populations; for instance, U.S clean energy bills exclude funding for Indigenous nations for their support of clean energy, and lack of respect for treaty rights results in greenhouse reductions rates that are too slow to protect Native resources.

In her 2019 book As Long as Grass Grows, Colville Confederated Tribes scholar Dina Gilio-Whitaker supports Kyle Powys Whyte's argument that settler colonialism is a form of environmental injustice "that wrongfully interferes with and erases the socioecological contexts required for Indigenous populations to experience the world as a place infused with responsibilities to humans, nonhumans, and ecosystems." According to Gilio-Whitaker, largescale dam projects in the 20th and 21st centuries are major sources of environmental injustice for Native communities. Flooding caused by dams displace Native Americans from their ancestral homelands, and it also destroys historical fishing sites. For example, the 1944 Pick Sloan Act was a state-sponsored dam project in Oceti Sakowin territory that reportedly displaced over a thousand Indigenous families. The land was also destroyed, as 90% of commercial timber was destroyed, thousands of acres of subsistence farms were flooded, and 75% of endemic flora and fauna were destroyed. Native American communities fought against the construction of many dams, but there were no mass protests.

=== Mental health ===
Land loss and historical violence reportedly contributes to elevated rates of mental illness, suicide, and addiction among Lakota men. According to sociologist J.M. Bacon, the prevalence of mental illness is not only due to the "loss of traditional ways of life, but because such a loss is perceived as a failure to uphold the sacred responsibility Lakota people have to the land." Bacon claims that the opposition that arises when Native Americans try to execute their responsibilities to the non-human world also results in mental health issues. A 2022 study revealed that Native American college students experienced the greatest increase of depression and anxiety between 2013 and 2021 out of all ethnic and racial groups. According to a 2023 study, a strong sense of ethnic identity can reduce the negative emotional impact of historical loss on Native American college students.

=== Dakota Access Pipeline ===
The 2016 construction of the Dakota Access Pipeline (DAPL) through unceded Oceti Sakowin territory presented a major threat against the community's water source. During the #NoDAPL protests, the National Guard and Emergency Management Assistant Compact were deployed to suppress resistance, and they often resorted to violence. A private security firm hired by DAPL compared the protestors to jihadists. Similarly, several FBI informants, working with Energy Transfer Partners, infiltrated the camp to collect intel and impede protests. According to Estes, the Army Corps encouraged the pipeline's benefactors to publish studies containing disinformation about the effects of the pipeline. Despite the protests, the pipeline was completed in 2017. Within six months of its completion, the pipeline leaked five times. Two major incidents in 2017 and 2019 resulted in a total spillage of 800,000 gallons.

=== Missing and murdered ===
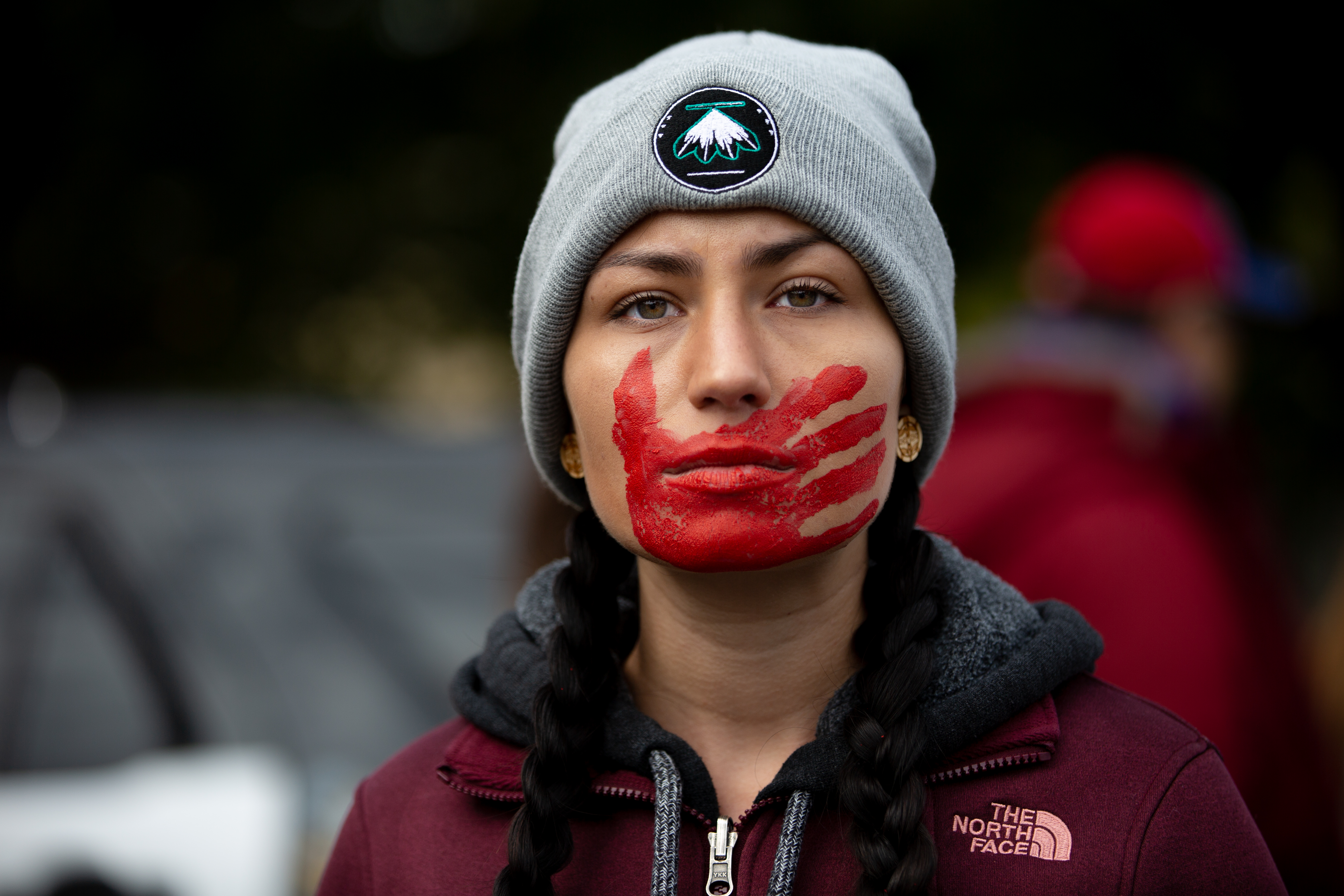
Woman protesting for MMIW in Rochester, Minnesota.

In the United States, Native American women are more than twice as likely to experience violence than any other demographic. One in three Indigenous women is sexually assaulted during her life, and 67% of these assaults are perpetrated by non-Native perpetrators. (Note: Native Americans constituted 0.7% of U.S. population in 2015.) According to research from the National Institute of Justice, it was found that American Indian women are 1.2 times as likely to experience lifetime violence, 1.8 times as likely to be a victim of stalking, and 1.7 times as likely to be victims of violence in the past year compared to the Non-Hispanic White population. Lisa Brunner, executive director of Sacred Spirits First National Coalition states, "What's happened through US Federal law and policy is they created lands of impunity where this is like a playground for serial rapists, batterers, killers, whoever and our children aren't protected at all."

=== Sterilization ===
The Family Planning Services and Population Research Act was passed in 1970, which subsidized sterilizations for patients receiving healthcare through the Indian Health Service. In the six years after the act was passed, an estimated 25% of childbearing-aged Native American women were sterilized. Some of the procedures were performed under coercion, or without understanding by those sterilized. In 1977, Marie Sanchez, chief tribal judge of the Northern Cheyenne Indian Reservation told the United Nations Convention on Indigenous Rights in Geneva, that Native American women suffered involuntary sterilization which she equated with modern genocide. Following Sanchez and other Native women's protests, the federal government adopted regulations that protected against involuntary sterilization, including sterilization consent forms. The efficacy of these regulations is contested by researchers. There are instances of Native women allegedly being tricked into signing consent forms. Since the passage of the 1976 Indian Health Care Improvement Act, Indigenous sovereignty has increased and sterilizations have declined.

== Indigenous resistance to genocide ==
Many Native American nations understood that contact with European settlers led to disease outbreaks and took measures to protect themselves. Historians argue that Indigenous populations were not inherently vulnerable to Old World disease but were rather weakened by colonial violence. According to Tai S. Edwards and Paul Kelton, Southeastern Woodlands people "intentionally limited contact with colonial settlements during outbreaks, used ritualized quarantine to reduce the spread of disease, and relied on experienced healers to provide physical and spiritual treatment." With these practices, Native American populations were able to rebound after disease in the absence of colonial-settler violence.

In the 1960s and 1970s, the grassroots Red Power Movement and American Indian Movement (AIM) sought to address discrimination and violence against Native Americans and to promote self-determination. Indigenous members of AIM staged the occupation of Alcatraz and the Trail of Broken Treaties. These movements catalyzed the 1974 International Indian Treaty Council and Women of All Red Nations (WARN). In 1974, Madonna Thunderhawk, a prominent member of AIM and WARN, founded the We Will Remember Survival School to teach Indigenous students about treaty rights and Native culture.

Contemporary Indigenous resistance to genocide includes rebuilding the systems of responsibility to each other and the non-human world that are disrupted by colonialism and environmental degradation. According to Whyte, the emerging field of Indigenous Environmental Studies and Sciences (IEES) presents an opportunity to center Indigenous systems of knowledge and foster resilience within environmental movements. IEES allows Indigenous communities to restore moral and reciprocal relationships with the non-human world to withstand the negative effects of climate change. For instance, Anishinaabe groups from the Great Lakes region are employing Indigenous science to recover sturgeon populations, with which these nations have an ancestral reciprocal relationship. Many of these tribes also hold ceremonies and feasts, open to non-Natives, to highlight the environmental and historical importance of sturgeon. The Haudenosaunee have addressed the industrial pollution of the St. Lawrence River by utilizing organizations such as the Akwesasne Task Force on the Environment, the Mothers for Milk Project, and Traditional Mohawk Nation Council of Chiefs.

In 2016, the Oceti Sakowin groups and allies protested the completion of the Dakota Access Pipeline that would threaten the Missouri River, the Standing Rock Indian Reservation's water supply. The protests led to the #NoDAPL movement. The youth-led movement raised awareness across social media and garnered non-Native support for the protests. The Keystone XL pipeline, proposed in 2008, was also met with resistance by Indigenous leaders and allies across Canada and the U.S.. These protests garnered national attention and resulted in the Obama administration denying the pipeline's cross-border permit. In 2021, the Biden administration again revoked the permit after the Trump administration granted it, representing a success for Native resistance efforts.

== Patterns of Removal and Displacement ==
During the French and Indian War (1754–1763), British colonial authorities in the Hudson Valley implemented policies that sought to forcibly remove Indigenous groups from their lands. This process combined military violence with legal and administrative measures, gradually transforming Native communities from allies into obstacles to colonial expansion. The British framed these removals as necessary for security and territorial development, marking an early instance of ethnic cleansing in North America.

== Memory and legacy ==
The United States has to date not undertaken any truth commission nor built a memorial for the genocide of Indigenous people. It does not acknowledge nor compensate for the historical violence against Native Americans that occurred during territorial expansion to the West Coast. American museums such as the Smithsonian Institution do not dedicate a section to the genocide. In 2013, the National Congress of American Indians passed a resolution to create a space for the National American Indian Holocaust Museum inside the Smithsonian, but it was ignored by the latter.

=== International politics ===
In March 2022, China's Ministry of Foreign Affairs published a formal communiqué titled "The American Genocide of the Indians—Historical Facts and Real Evidence", which concluded that US policies against Native Americans constituted genocide under both international law and US domestic law, and called on the US government to address its "hypocrisy and double standards on human rights issues, and take seriously the severe racial problems and atrocities in its own country." Chinese officials have also cited the history of Native Americans in response to the United States and international accusations that China's persecution of Uyghurs constituted genocide, with China's foreign minister dismissing those accusations as "absurd" and a "complete lie", while pointing to the treatment of Native Americans as the real genocide. After US president Joe Biden released a statement recognizing the Armenian genocide in April 2021, Turkish president Recep Tayyip Erdoğan cited the genocide of Native Americans to deny the Armenian genocide and accuse Biden of hypocrisy.

=== Historiography ===
American historian Ned Blackhawk said that nationalist historiographies have been forms of denial that erase the history of destruction of European colonial expansion. Blackhawk said that near consensus has emerged that genocide against some Indigenous peoples took place in North America following colonization.

In An American Genocide, Benjamin Madley argues that Indigenous resistance to genocidal campaigns has resulted in these campaigns as being inaccurately described as war or battles, instead of genocidal massacres.

David Moshman, a professor at University of Nebraska–Lincoln, highlighted the lack of awareness of the American public, stating, "The nations of the Americas remain virtually oblivious to their emergence from a series of genocides that were deliberately aimed at, and succeeded in eliminating, hundreds of Indigenous cultures."

Historian Gary Anderson, suggests that while what happened with the indigenous population was ethnic cleansing, but it was not genocide. Anderson argues that it couldn't have been genocide because "large numbers of Indians survived" and further asserts that in order for violence to be considered a genocide "a legitimate government must plan, organize, and implement the crime". But professor Ashley Sousa rejects those as inconsistent with the legal definition of genocide, which allows for a partial destruction of a people to be considered genocide.

== See also ==
- Colonialism and genocide
- Genocide of indigenous peoples
- Historical racial and ethnic demographics of the United States
- History of Native Americans in the United States
  - Racism against Native Americans in the United States
    - Thomas Jefferson and Native Americans
- Indigenous peoples in Canada
  - Canadian genocide of Indigenous peoples
  - Racism in Canada
- Indigenous peoples of Mexico
  - Racism in Mexico
- List of ethnic cleansing campaigns
- List of genocides
- List of massacres in the United States
- Population history of the Indigenous peoples of the Americas
- Race and ethnicity in the United States
- Racism in the United States
  - Mass racial violence in the United States
    - Black genocide in the United States – the notion African Americans have been subjected to genocide throughout their history because of racism against them, another aspect of racism in the United States
- White supremacy in the United States

== Externals links ==
- Media related to Native American genocide at Wikimedia Commons
