= Round Valley Settler Massacres of 1856–1859 =

Attacks on indigenous American people

Round Valley Settler Massacres
- Part of the California genocide
- Location: Round Valley, California
- Date: 1856–1859
- Attack type: Genocidal massacre, ethnic cleansing, kidnapping, slavery, mass rape
- Deaths: 1,000+
- Victim: Yuki people
- Perpetrators: White settlers and private militias
- Motive: Dispossession of Indians from their land, pursuit of Indian bounties and indentured servants

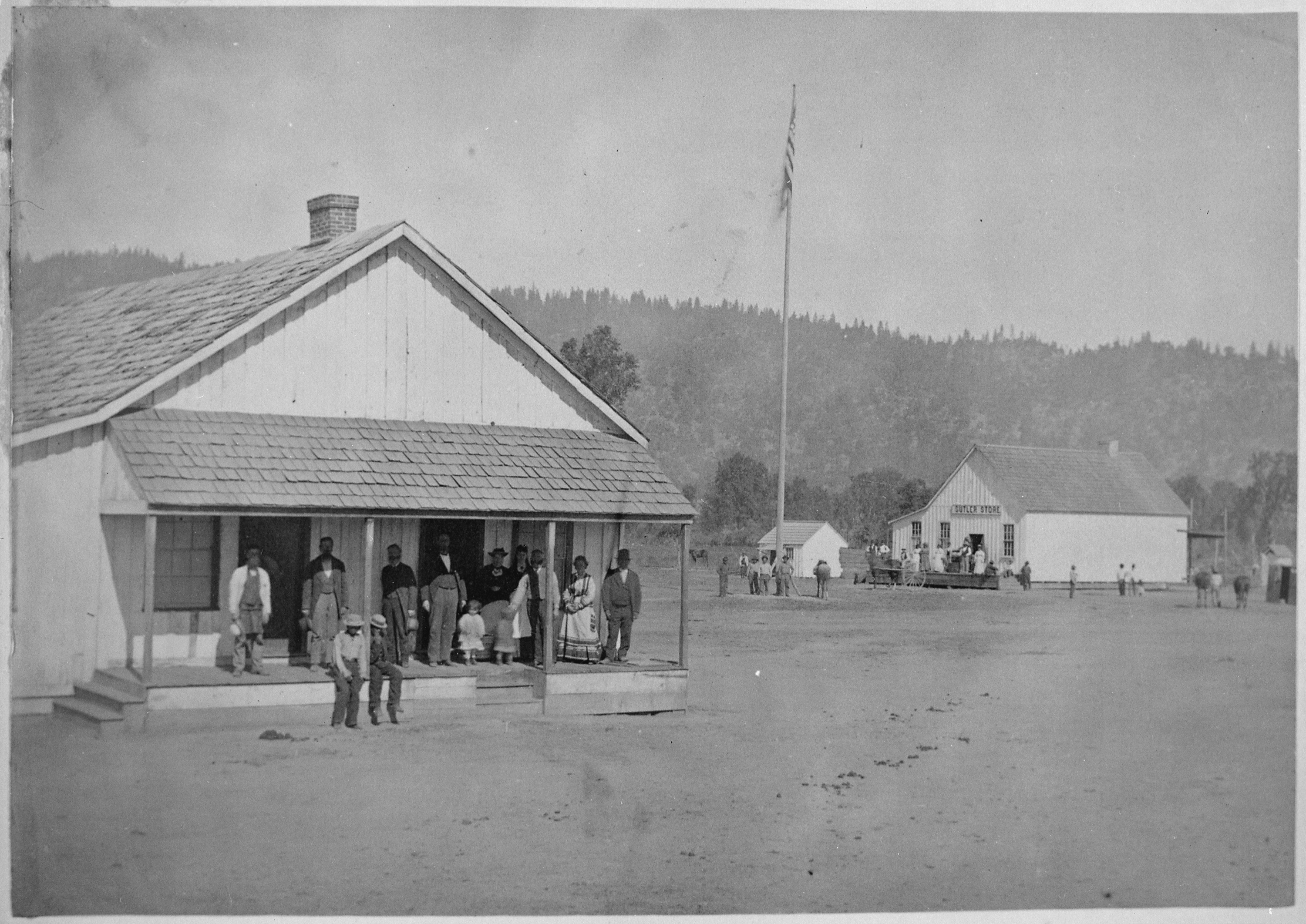
Office and sutler store, Round Valley Agency, California, 1876

The Round Valley Settler Massacres of 1856–1859 were a series of massacres committed by early white settlers of California with cooperation and funding from the government of California and the support of prominent Californians against the Yuki people of Round Valley, Mendocino County, California. More than 1,000 Yuki are estimated to have been killed; many others were enslaved and only 300 survived. The intent of the massacres was to exterminate the Yuki and gain control of the land they inhabited. U.S. Army soldiers deployed to the valley stopped further killings. In 1862, the California legislature revoked a law which permitted the kidnapping and enslavement of Native Americans in the state.

== History ==
=== Background ===
White immigrants flooded into Northern California in 1848 due to the California Gold Rush, increasing the settler population of California from 13,000 to well over 300,000 in little more than a decade. The sudden influx of miners and settlers on top of the nearly 300,000 Native Americans living in the area strained space and resources.

On April 22, 1850, the fledgling California state legislature passed the Act for the Government and Protection of Indians, legalizing the kidnapping and forced servitude of Indians by White settlers. In 1851, the civilian governor of California, Peter Hardeman Burnett, declared, "That a war of extermination will continue to be waged … until the Indian race becomes extinct, must be expected. While we cannot anticipate this result but with painful regret, the inevitable destiny of the race is beyond the power or wisdom of man to avert. Situated as California is, we must expect a long continued and harassing irregular warfare with the Indians upon our borders .... Although few in numbers, and unskilled in the use of fire arms, they seem to understand all the advantages of their position; and they consequently resort to that predatory warfare, most distressing to us, and secure to them." This expectation soon found its way into law. An 1851 legislative measure not only gave settlers the right to organize lynch mobs to kill Indians, but allowed them to submit their expenses to the government. By 1852, the state had authorized over a million dollars in such claims. In 1856, a San Francisco Bulletin editorial stated, "Extermination is the quickest and cheapest remedy, and effectually prevents all other difficulties when an outbreak [of Indian violence] occurs."

In 1854, when the first six white settlers arrived in Round Valley, somewhere between 6,000 and 20,000 Yuki people inhabited the valley and its surrounding area. Those first six settlers immediately attacked the Yuki without provocation, killing 40 of them in the Asbill Massacre.

By 1855–56, Yuki women were being kidnapped in large numbers and sold to outside men as there was a shortage of women among the miners and settlers. Pierce Asbill, the instigator of the Asbill Massacre, stayed in the area and personally kidnapped at least 35 Yuki women over the next year. Indian Agent Simon Storms reported upon arriving in 1856 that the Yuki people feared white men due to the kidnapping of women and children and in 1857 Indian Agent Vincent Geiger stated that in Round Valley: "the Indians...have very few children—most of them doubtless having been stolen and sold." By 1860, settler William Frazier reported that there were no longer any children among the Indians they encountered and blamed kidnapping by outsiders as the cause. Historians Sherburne Cooke and Benjamin Madley suggest that these abductions were one of several instigators of violent conflict in the valley. William Brewer, a member of the California Geological Survey in the early 1860s, directly blamed child-stealing of Indian children for the rise in Indian/settler conflict and the atrocities that followed.

A second instigator of conflict was competition for resources. The new settlers killed deer in large numbers and cut off Yuki access to fields where they had gathered plants and hunted small game. This threatened the Yuki with starvation, and at times Yuki men killed and ate grazing cattle to survive. Many cattle and horses also wandered off and died of natural causes, but these deaths were also blamed on the Indians and used to build animosity towards them. U.S. Army Lieutenant Edward Dillon implicated California Superintendent of Indian Affairs Thomas J. Henley, current ranch owner and former California Supreme Court Judge Serranus Clinton Hastings, and Hastings's ranch manager H.L. Hall in a plot to build hatred towards the Indians by holding town-hall style public gatherings where settlers aired their grievances against them, real or imagined. In this manner they created community buy-in to their campaign of atrocities which drove the Indians off the land and allowed them to have the valley to themselves.

=== Incidents and death toll ===
A band of 20–30 men, a significant portion of the several dozen white settlers occupying the valley at that time, committed a series of attacks against the Yuki Indians between 1856 and the summer of 1859.

One Round Valley settler, Dryden Lacock, testified to the California State Legislature that he regularly took part in expeditions that would kill 50–60 Indians in a trip, as often as two to three trips a week at times, from 1856 to 1860. Settler William Scott testified before the legislature that H.L. Hall was a leader of vigilantes, killing all the Indians he could find whenever he encountered them and even poisoning their food and supplies. Hall's culpability was verified by Army Lieutenant Edward Dillon, who referred to Hall as a "monster" who killed men, women, and children, regardless of any crimes committed and lamented that he had basically depopulated the county of Indians. Hall, despite remaining silent as to the number of Indians he had killed, did admit under oath to executing Indian women, children, and even infants.

Special Treasury Agent J. Ross Browne's account of the attacks is vivid: "At [Round Valley], during the winter of 1858–59, more than a hundred and fifty peaceable Indians, including women and children, were cruelly slaughtered by the whites who had settled there under official authority. ... Armed parties went into the rancherias in open day, when no evil was apprehended, and shot the Indians down—weak, harmless, and defenseless as they were—without distinction of age or sex; shot down women with sucking babes at their breasts; killed or crippled the naked children that were running about."

As early as September 1857, Superintendent Henley had stated that the campaign against the Yuki would continue until they were either exterminated or driven from the area entirely. Special Treasury agent J. Ross Browne in September 1858 called it a "war of extermination" against the Yuki with 20–30 armed white men engaging in months of constant attacks. By August 1859, after three years of a sustained campaign of atrocities, the Sacramento Union wrote that the local Indians appeared doomed to extirpation.

A few specific attacks of which there is witness testimony are:

- A local paper reported 55 Indians killed in Clinton Valley on October 8, 1856.
- A white farmer, John Lawson, admitted an attack killing eight Indians, three by shooting and five by hanging, after some of his hogs were stolen. He stated that these killings were a common practice.
- A white farmer, Isaac Shanon, testified to killing 14 Indians in a revenge attack after a white man was killed in early 1858.
- White persons from the Sacramento Valley came into Round Valley and killed four Yuki Indians with the help of locals in June 1858, despite having been warned against it by Indian Agents.
- White settlers attacked and killed nine Indians in the mountains edging the valley in November 1858.
- Former Superintendent of Indian Affairs, Thomas Henley (fired two months earlier for embezzling funds), led a massacre of 11 Yuki Indians in August 1859.

Due to the overwhelming number of killings, an exact death toll is unknowable. The following estimates were made by government agents and newspapers at the time:

- 1856: 300 total killed over the course of the year.
- Winter 1856–57: About 75 Yuki Indians killed over the course of the winter.
- March–April 1858: 300–400 male Yukis killed in three weeks.
- November 1858 – January 1859: 150+ or 170 Yuki Indians killed between November and January
- March–May 1859: 240 Yuki killed in assaults led by H.L. Hall in revenge for the slaughter of Judge Hasting's horse and a total of 600 men, women, and children killed within the previous year.

These estimates suggest well over 1,000 Yuki deaths at the hands of white settlers. (See Cook, Sherburne; The California Indian and White Civilization Part III, pg 7, for an argument in favor of the approximate reliability of figures of Indians killed at this time.) The white settler John Burgess testified that 10–15 Indians were killed for every beef that had been killed. Lieutenant Edward Dillon stated that many crimes were unknown as settlers "will not testify against each other, and in most cases of this nature, Indians are the only witnesses." Yuki Indian depositions were taken during the investigation of the murders by the California legislature in 1860, but all of these depositions have either been lost or destroyed.

Little retaliation or defense was possible from the Yuki. On 24 September 1857, over three years after the first massacre of Indians in Round Valley, Indian Agent Geiger reported that a white man had been killed by a Yuki for the first time. Another white man was killed in early 1858, and by the end of 1858 a total of four white men had been killed. Reports from the U.S. Army suggest that at least two of the men killed were well known for grievous crimes against the Indians and that the Indians had been provoked in both instances.

== Repercussions ==
=== Military response ===
In October 1857, Superintendent Henley requested a federal detachment of troops, but Secretary of War Jefferson Davis refused to provide them and said it was not the military's responsibility. Henley, who himself ranched in the valley and was culpable in some of the massacres, may have made the request merely as a cover—in fact, in making the request in order to "preserve peace", he still wrote that the extermination of the Indians was the expected result. In January 1859, 17 soldiers were finally deployed to Round Valley by the 6th Infantry Regiment under command of Major Edward Johnson, where they witnessed serious abuses and killings. However, they received no support from the authorities, and were ordered by Army command to avoid confronting or incarcerating the white settlers. Major Johnson reported to command that he had tried to stop the killings but with little effect. By January 1860, they had been reassigned elsewhere.

On 1 May 1859, Major Johnson explicitly stated in a report to the governor of California that "The Yukas have not been, for the last two years, nor are they now, at open war with the whites; But the whites have waged a relentless war of extermination against the Yukas," and declared to the governor that the Indians, not the white settlers, needed protection. Governor John B. Weller asked Pacific Department commander General W. S. Clark to deploy additional soldiers, but the general refused. In his place, a state militia captain F. F. Flint was deputized to investigate, but Flint advocated for killing the Yuki rather than protecting them. Major Johnson stated with resignation in August 1859: "I believe it to be the settled determination of many of the inhabitants to exterminate the Indians."

=== Jarboe's War ===
In July 1859, a white settler named Walter S. Jarboe, already known for his brutal killings, formed an organized army of 40 mercenaries to destroy the Round Valley Indians. He sought approval and payment from the state of California, and received an official appointment to kill Indians from the governor himself. With state government support Jarboe launched a new, organized campaign of atrocities on the valley, known as "Jarboe's War" or the "Mendocino War" by the settlers. In the middle of his campaign, Jarboe declared to the governor, "However cruel it may be ... nothing short of extermination will suffice to rid the Country of them [the Yuki]." Within six months, Jarboe's mercenaries had killed 283 "warriors" in 23 attacks, along with hundreds of women and children as well, and captured nearly 300 Yuki Indians to be relocated to reservations. (See Mendocino War)

=== California Legislature Joint Special Committee ===
In 1860, a Joint Special Committee of the California Legislature was formed to investigate the "Mendocino Indian War" and complaints of Indian harassment from politically influential ranchers. The majority report of this committee (authored by four of the committee's five members) states:

"Accounts are daily coming in from the counties on the Coast Range, of sickening atrocities and wholesale slaughters of great numbers of defenseless Indians in that region of country. Within the last four months, more Indians have been killed by our people than during the century of Spanish and Mexican domination. For an evil of this magnitude, some one is responsible. Either our government, or our citizens, or both, are to blame. No provocation has been shown, if any could be, to justify such acts. We must admit that the wrong has been the portion of the Indian—the blame with his white brother. In relation to the recent difficulty between the whites and Indians in Mendocino County, your committee desire to say that no war, or a necessity for a war, has existed, or at the present time does exist. We are unwilling to attempt to dignify, by the term 'war' as slaughter of beings, who at least possess human form, and who make no resistance, and make no attacks, either on the person or residence of the citizen."

The majority report recommended that in order to save the Indians, it would be necessary to expand the size of the reservation by a factor of four to include nearly all of Round Valley, to buy out the white settlers with property in the valley, and to invest more money in ensuring that the Indians had protection and an adequate food supply. The minority report, authored by dissenting California House member Joseph B. Lamar (Mendocino, Sonoma), suggested instead that the settlers had acted appropriately and that the only solution was to round up the Indians as slaves and have the government provide land for their upkeep to their white masters.

Despite the support of four out of five committee members, the California Legislature chose to ignore the majority report and it was never read to the full legislature. Instead, the Legislature generally took the route of Rep. Lamar in blaming the Indians for the conflict. Lamar helped to push through legislation broadening the Indians eligible to be forcibly enslaved by white settlers. An editorial in the San Francisco Herald tragically mocked the government's disturbing position: "We ... propose to the Legislature to create the office of Indian Butcher, with a princely salary, and confer it upon the man who has killed most Indians in a given time, provided it be satisfactorily shown that the Indians were unarmed at the time, and the greater portion of them were squaws and papooses."

=== State sponsorship of killing ===
Despite such criticism, California legislators indeed continued state support for the ongoing slaughter. On 12 April 1860, legislators appropriated $9,347.39 for "payment of the indebtedness incurred by the expedition against the Indians in the county of Mendocino." They also passed a law expanding the age and condition of Indians available for forced slavery. A Sacramento Daily Union article of the time accused high-pressure lobbyists interested in profiting off enslaved Indians of pushing the law through, gave examples of how wealthy individuals had abused the law to acquire Indian slaves from the reservations, and stated, "The Act authorizes as complete a system of slavery, without any of the checks and wholesome restraints of slavery, as ever was devised."

=== Close of "war" ===
In 1861, the editor of the Mendocino Herald visited Round Valley and declared that there were no more than five or six hundred Yuki Indians left, out of an original population that had been more than ten times larger only five years earlier. A company-sized deployment of federal soldiers finally stopped the violence against the Indians in 1862. The law allowing the kidnapping and enslavement of Indians was revoked in 1863. By 1864, only 300 Yuki Indians remained.

=== Legacy ===
Serranus Clinton Hastings, a prominent California politician and landowner in the 1850s, was accused of being involved in the massacres. In 2021, publicity about his involvement caused the name of the Hastings College of the Law to be changed to the University of California College of the Law, San Francisco.

== See also ==
- Asbill massacre
- Sand Creek massacre
- Mendocino War
- List of Indian massacres
