= Asbill massacre =

1854 murder of 40 Yuki people in California

Coordinates: 39.7784°N 123.2286°W

The Asbill massacre refers to the murder of 40 Yuki people in Round Valley in 1854 by a band of six White explorers from Missouri.

== History ==
=== Background ===
White immigrants flooded into northern California in 1848 due to the California Gold Rush, increasing the non-Indian population of California from 13,000 to well over 300,000 in little more than a decade. The sudden influx of miners and settlers on top of the nearly 300,000 Native Americans living in the area strained space and resources.

In 1851, the civilian governor of California declared, "That a war of extermination will continue to be waged, until the Indian race becomes extinct, must be expected." This expectation soon found its way into law. An 1851 legislative measure not only gave settlers the right to organize lynch mobs to kill Indians, but allowed them to submit their expenses to the government. By 1852 the state had authorized over a million dollars in such claims.

=== Incident ===
On May 15, 1854, six Missouri-based explorers led by Pierce Asbill happened upon Round Valley while searching for a route between Weaverville, an interior mining center, and Petaluma, an important river port. Round Valley was in an isolated, difficult to access region of the Coast Range, allowing it to remain relatively untouched by settlers and miners to this point. While crossing a meadow, the explorers spotted movement in the grass and realized that Indians were in the valley.

Asbill stated, "We've come a long way from Missouri to locate this place... an' be damned if wigglin' grass 'ull keep us away! Git a–hold of yer weapons—we'uns are goin' in!"

The party proceeded to a creek bed where they encountered a large settlement of Yuki. Through the combination of superior weaponry, horses, and focused intent, the party killed approximately 40 of the people.

=== Repercussions ===
Neither Asbill nor any of his fellow settlers were charged with any malfeasance for killing the nonthreatening Indians. Asbill stayed on to hunt the land and eventually began kidnapping and trafficking Yuki women to be sold to non-Indian men outside of the valley. Asbill sold 35 women in this manner by 1855.

== Aftermath ==
Due to Round Valley's remote location, it became a destination for other Indians the settlers had forced off their lands, and soon its native population swelled to 20,000, while the White settlers in the area remained a few dozen. With their concentrated and vulnerable position (along with the 1850 California law "Act for the Government and Protection of Indians," which legalized the kidnapping and forced servitude of Indians by White settlers), slave raids against the Round Valley Indians became common. Further conflict soon led to terrorist attacks meant to drive the Indians from the valley (see Round Valley Settler Massacres of 1856 - 1859 and Mendocino War). By 1860 all remaining Yuki Indians had been forced into reservations. In the 1880s, settlers began taking over the reservation lands which instigated another "war" (see Round Valley War), resulting in the further loss of land and lives by the Yuki Indians.

== See also ==
- Round Valley Settler Massacres of 1856 - 1859
- Mendocino War
- Round Valley War
- List of Indian massacres
