= John B. Weller =

American politician (1812–1875)

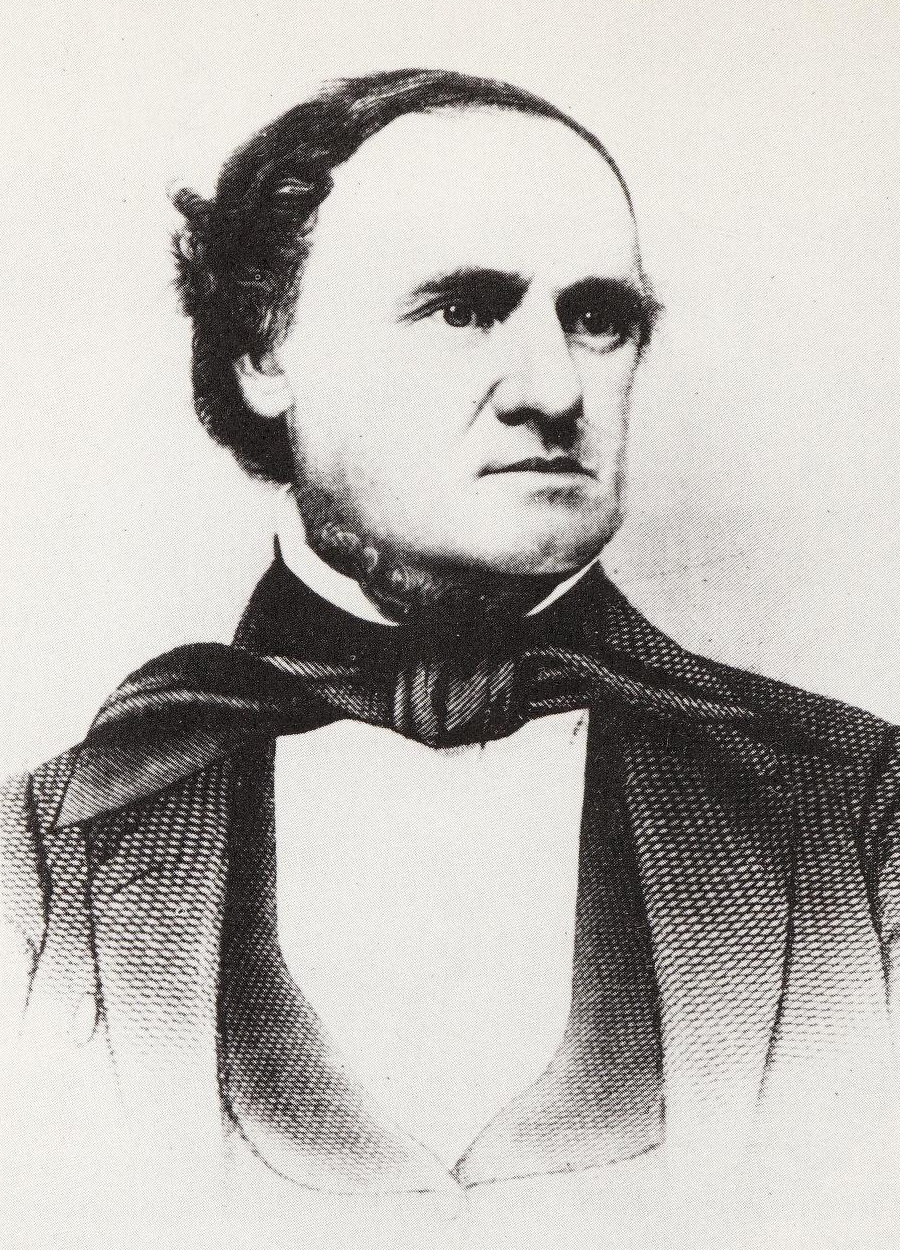

United States Minister to Mexico
- In office January 30, 1861 – May 14, 1861
- Appointed by: James Buchanan
- Preceded by: Robert Milligan McLane
- Succeeded by: Thomas Corwin

5th Governor of California
- In office January 8, 1858 – January 9, 1860
- Lieutenant: Joseph Walkup
- Preceded by: J. Neely Johnson
- Succeeded by: Milton Latham

United States Senator from California
- In office January 30, 1852 – March 3, 1857
- Preceded by: John C. Frémont
- Succeeded by: David C. Broderick

Member of the U.S. House of Representatives from Ohio's 2nd district
- In office March 4, 1839 – March 3, 1845
- Preceded by: Taylor Webster
- Succeeded by: Francis A. Cunningham

County Prosecutor of Butler County, Ohio
- In office 1833–1836

Personal details
- Born: February 22, 1812 Montgomery, Ohio, U.S.
- Died: August 17, 1875 (aged 63) New Orleans, Louisiana, U.S.
- Party: Democratic
- Other political affiliations: Lecompton Democrat (1858)
- Spouse: Elizabeth Stanton
- Education: Miami University (BA)
- Profession: Ambassador, lawyer, politician

John B. Weller (February 22, 1812 – August 17, 1875) was the fifth governor of California from January 8, 1858, to January 9, 1860, who earlier had served as a congressman from Ohio and a U.S. senator from California, and minister to Mexico.

== Life and career ==
=== Early life ===
Weller was born in Hamilton County, Ohio, and attended the public schools and Miami University in Oxford, Ohio. He then studied law, was admitted to the bar and practiced in Butler County, Ohio. Weller served as prosecuting attorney of Butler County from 1833 until 1836.

=== Political career ===
In 1838 he was elected as a Democrat from Ohio to the 26th Congress. He was reelected to the 27th and 28th Congresses, serving from 1839 until 1845.

He served in the 1st Regiment of Ohio Volunteers as a Lieutenant Colonel during Mexican–American War from 1846 until 1847, and then was an unsuccessful Democratic candidate for Governor of Ohio in 1848, a bitterly fought campaign, and the only disputed election for Ohio Governor of the 19th century. A select joint committee of the Ohio General Assembly finally established January 22, 1849, that Weller lost by 311 votes to Whig Seabury Ford.

In 1849 and 1850, he was a member of the commission to establish the boundary line between California and Mexico. He was replaced by President Zachary Taylor, a Whig, who first named John C. Frémont. After Frémont resigned without beginning his duties, Taylor appointed John Russell Bartlett.

=== Move to California ===
Weller's inauguration on the cover of Hutchings' Illustrated California Magazine, March 1858

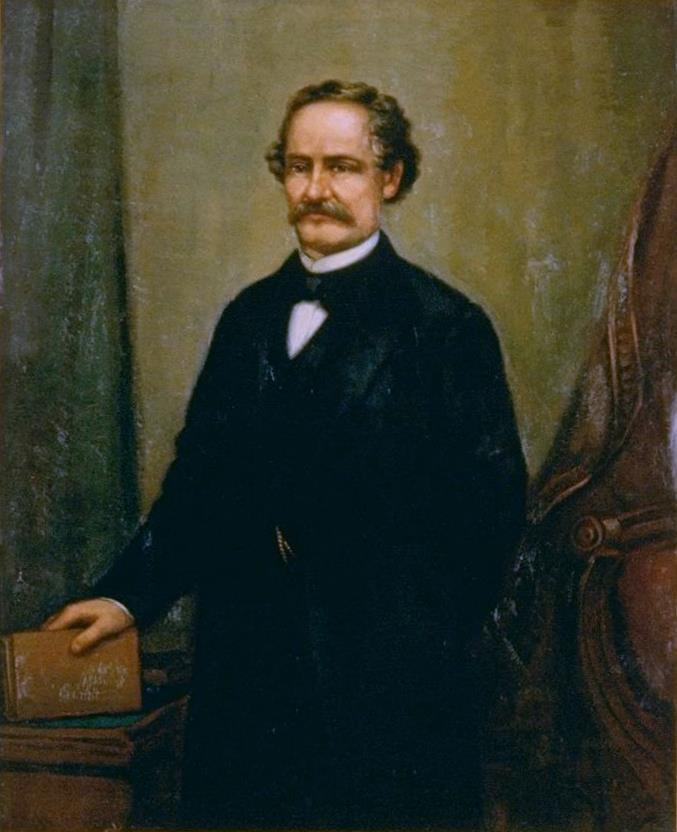
Weller's official gubernatorial portrait

Weller then settled in California and practiced law. When Frémont's term as a U.S. Senator expired on March 3, 1851, the state legislature failed to elect a replacement for the term that started on March 4, so the position remained vacant. In 1852, the legislature elected Weller, and he served from January 30, 1852, to March 3, 1857. During the 34th Congress he was chairman of the U.S. Senate Committee on Military Affairs.

After running unsuccessfully for reelection to the Senate, in 1857 he was elected Governor of California and he served from 1858 to 1860. As governor, he intended to make California an independent republic if the North and South divided over slavery, and he personally led an assault on San Quentin Prison to take possession from a commercial contractor.

=== Diplomatic career ===
After leaving the governorship, he was appointed Ambassador to Mexico near the end of 1860 by the lame-duck Buchanan administration. He presented his credentials in 1861, but was soon recalled by the new Lincoln Administration. He moved to New Orleans, Louisiana, in 1867, where he continued the practice of law and served as a U.S. Commissioner.

== California Genocide ==
As governor, Weller facilitated the genocide of the Yuki tribe by granting a State Commission to Walter S. Jarboe to exterminate them. Jarboe was commissioned by Weller after the United States Army refused to campaign against the Yuki. Jarboe's band, 'The Eel River Rangers,' massacred at least 283 men, presenting the State with a bill for $11,143 for the killings. According to Benjamin Madley, Weller 'officially sanctioned Genocide'. The massacre of the Yuki during the Mendocino War was condemned by the California legislature, though no official action was taken against Jarboe or Wells.

== Death and burial ==
He died in New Orleans in 1875. Original interment was at Girod Street Cemetery in New Orleans. That burying ground was destroyed in 1959 and unclaimed remains were commingled with 15,000 others and deposited beneath Hope Mausoleum, St. John's Cemetery, New Orleans.

== Family ==
Weller's first wife was Ann E. Ryan, who died in 1836. In 1840, he married Cornelia A. Bryan, who died in 1842. He married Susan McDowell Taylor in 1845, and she died in 1848; she was a daughter of William Taylor, niece of Thomas Hart Benton, and cousin of Jessie Benton Frémont. In 1854, he married Elizabeth Winona Brockelbank (previously married to Stephen Stanton, with whom she had a son, Josiah).

Weller's father-in-law, John A. Bryan, was a U.S. diplomat. His brother-in-law, Charles Henry Bryan, was a California State Senator.

== See also ==
- California genocide
- Asbill massacre
- Round Valley Settler Massacres of 1856–1859

== Sources ==
- Sobel, Robert; Raimo, John (1978). Biographical Directory of the Governors of the United States, 1789-1978. Vol. 1. Westport, CT: Meckler Books. ISBN 9780930466008.
- Weller, Ralph H. (1999). The Hieronimus Weller Family in America. Newburgh, NY: R. H. Weller.

Political offices
Preceded by J. Neely Johnson	Governor of California; January 8, 1858 – January 9, 1860	Succeeded by Milton Latham
U.S. Senate
Preceded by John C. Frémont	U.S. senator (Class 1) from California; 1852–1857; Served alongside: William M. Gwin	Succeeded by David C. Broderick
U.S. House of Representatives
Preceded by Taylor Webster	United States Representative from Ohio's 2nd congressional district 1839–1845	Succeeded by Francis A. Cunningham
Party political offices
Preceded by David Tod	Democratic Party nominee for Governor of Ohio; 1848	Succeeded by Reuben Wood
Preceded by John Bigler	Democratic nominee for Governor of California; 1857	Succeeded by John Currey
