= Walter S. Jarboe =

Perpetrator of the California Genocide

- Born: c. 1829; Washington County, Kentucky, U.S.
- Died: March 12, 1865 (aged 35/36); California, U.S.
- Service / branch: California National Guard
- Commands: Eel River Rangers
- Known for: Massacres during the California genocide against the Yuki people
- Battles / wars: Round Valley Settler Massacres of 1856–1859; Mendocino War

Walter S. Jarboe (c. 1829 – March 12, 1865) was an American militia leader and perpetrator of massacres against the Yuki people during the California genocide.

== Round Valley Massacres ==
Tensions between settlers and the local Yuki population simmered for years before the Conquest of California. Before California was admitted to the United States, a steep decline in the California Indian population occurred under Spanish and later Mexican rule.

=== Governor approval for Yuki massacres ===
An early settler to California after the Mexican–American War, Jarboe petitioned Governor John B. Weller to eradicate the Yukis of Mendocino County. Weller gave Jarboe official permission to launch an eradication campaign, after United States Army officers refused.

=== "Jarboe's War" ===
With Governor Weller's permission, Jarboe established the Eel River Rangers in Mendocino to harass and murder local Yukis in July 1859. Jarboe wrote to Governor Weller, "However cruel it may be ... nothing short of extermination will suffice to rid the Country of [the Yuki]."

Jarboe's Eel River Rangers slaughtered at least 283 Yuki, not counting women and children. Additionally, at least 292 Yuki were forcibly deported to Mendocino Indian Reservation. By 1860, the Yuki population of Mendocino fell 80%.

In 1860, the Eel River Rangers were disbanded after largely depopulating the Yuki in Mendocino.

== Condemnation of Jarboe ==
In 1860, a Joint Special Committee of the California State Legislature was called to investigate the Mendocino War. The special committee voted 4–1 in favor of condemning the slaughter and deportation of the Yuki. Criticizing Jarboe, the committee commented "We are unwilling to attempt to dignify, by the term 'war' as slaughter of beings, who at least possess human form, and who make no resistance, and make no attacks, either on the person or residence of the citizen."

The 1860 report fell on deaf ears and supporters of Jarboe prevented its reading before the California State Legislature. Representative Joseph Lamar of Mendocino dissented on the report and instead praised Jarboe.
