= Round Valley War =

Date	1887
Location	Round Valley Indian Reservation, California, United States
Result	Settler victory

Belligerents
American colonists	Yuki Indians

The Round Valley War was an 1887 conflict between American colonists and Yuki Indians on the Round Valley Indian Tribes of the Round Valley Reservation in California. The Round Valley War was not an isolated incident but part of a broader pattern of settler colonialism and violence against Native populations in California. State-sponsored militias, land appropriation policies, and legal maneuvers collectively facilitated the dispossession and near-eradication of Indigenous peoples across the region.

The conflict started as colonists were beginning to encroach on reservation lands, making the already difficult circumstances for the Yuki people who had been placed there following the Mendocino War even more unfavourable. The Yuki population of Round Valley suffered a catastrophic decline between 1854 and 1864, dropping from an estimated 20,000 individuals to fewer than 500. This collapse was driven by settler violence, forced relocations, disease, and neglect at the Nome Cult Farm reservation. Archival records reveal that mortality rates at the reservation were extremely high, with agents reporting deaths from starvation and disease on a near-daily basis. The Yuki had lost title to their land when the senate caved to pressure from California to refuse to ratify treaties with California tribes, stemming from California's early disruption of federal policy.

The conflict started as settlers were beginning to encroach on reservation lands, after the Superintendent of Indian Affairs, Thomas J. Henley, who was responsible for receiving Round Valley for the government, invited citizens and relatives to settle within the reservations bounds right before he left the Indian service under suspicion of corruption. Henley and his sons took hold of the reservation through both organized and spontaneous violence against the Yuki. Many settlers were motivated by state pay for attacks on Indian Rancherías when committing violence against the Yuki. Many of the settlers of Round Valley had been trying to assert their private rights over Round Valley as many as thirty years prior to the conflict. However, most of the settlers did not seize any land prior to the Round Valley Indian Reservation's expansion in 1873. Settlers seized over 90 percent of the executive-order reservation land, which totaled 102,118 acres. By the end of the conflict the reservation land was reduced to 38,000 acres by recommendation of the Round Valley Commission.

The Federal Office of Indian Affairs moved to have the trespassing settlers evicted. This was due in part to pleas made by the Yuki Indians over the years. One of these pleas was an 1885 petition that echoed complaints about broken promises to the lands and an increasing number of trespassers on the reservation. The petition also emphasized that if given control of their land, the Yuki would become self-sustainable and not request another cent from the government. This incentive was reiterated many times. The first delegation that came to inspect Round Valley was an 1884 delegation from Henry L. Dawes' Senate Committee on Indian Affairs with the aim of investigating the "condition of certain Indians in California." Dawes found that the complaints from the Indian Office as well as the Yuki themselves were valid, concluding that the trespassers must be removed. This prompted the beginning of Federal action at the Round Valley Reservation. Captain Richard G. Shaw was deployed to Round Valley shortly thereafter, told to prepare for a deployment that would extend through June 1888. The settlers turned to local authorities, and on October 24, D.H. Osborn, the Sheriff of Mendocino County, attempted to arrest Shaw, who had filed the accusations against the settlers. Shaw "respectfully declined" and continued with evictions, claiming he "did not deem it consistent . . . with my duties as an officer."

After the conflict, surviving Yuki people contributed to the local economy by working as agricultural laborers. This transition from forced labor to wage work allowed some families to sustain themselves, despite continued marginalization. Scholars argue that Yuki labor was vital to the region’s economic development during the late 19th and early 20th centuries. Historians argue that the Round Valley War and related events qualify as genocide under the 1948 UN Genocide Convention. Acts such as massacres, the spread of disease, and the deliberate imposition of lethal living conditions align with several criteria outlined in the convention. The dramatic population decline of the Yuki, from tens of thousands to a few hundred, exemplifies these genocidal actions.

== Bibliography ==
- Baumgardner, Frank H. III (2006). Killing for Land in Early California: Indian blood at Round Valley: Founding the Nome Cult Indian Farm. New York: Algora Pub. ISBN 978-0-87586-364-1. ISBN 0-87586-365-5.
- Adams, K., & Schneider, K. (2011). " Washington is a Long Way Off": The" Round Valley War" and the Limits of Federal Power on a California Indian Reservation. Pacific Historical Review, 80(4), 557–596.
- Oandasan, W. (1982). Ukomno'm: The Yuki Indians of Northern California, a Review Essay. By Virginia P. Miller. American Indian Culture and Research Journal, 6(4), 95–104.
- Carranco, L., & Beard, E. (1981). Genocide and Vendetta: The Round Valley Wars of Northern California. Norman, OK: University of Oklahoma Press.
- Madley, B. (2004). Patterns of frontier genocide 1803–1910: the Aboriginal Tasmanians, the Yuki of California, and the Herero of Namibia. Journal of Genocide Research, 6(2), 167–192.
- Bauer, William J. (2006). ""We Were All Migrant Workers Here": Round Valley Indian Labor in Northern California". Western Historical Quarterly. 37 (1): 43–63.
- Madley, B. (2008). California’s Yuki Indians: Defining Genocide in Native American History. Western Historical Quarterly, 39(3), 303–332.
