= Thomas J. Henley =

American politician

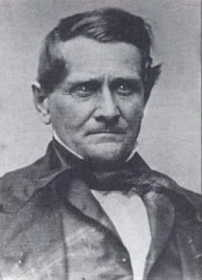

Member of the U.S. House of Representatives from Indiana's 2nd district
- In office March 4, 1843 – March 3, 1849
- Preceded by: Richard W. Thompson
- Succeeded by: Cyrus L. Dunham

27th Speaker of the Indiana House of Representatives
- In office December 5, 1842 – December 4, 1843
- Preceded by: John W. Davis
- Succeeded by: Andrew L. Robinson

Member of the Indiana House of Representatives from the Clark County district
- In office December 5, 1832 – December 4, 1843

Superintendent of Indian Affairs for California
- In office May 31, 1854 – March 9, 1859
- President: Millard Fillmore
- Preceded by: Edward Fitzgerald Beale
- Succeeded by: James Y. McDuffie

Personal details
- Born: June 18, 1808 Richmond, Indiana, U.S.
- Died: May 1, 1875 (aged 66) Mendocino County, California, U.S
- Party: Democratic
- Education: Indiana University

Thomas Jefferson Henley (June 18, 1808 – May 1, 1875) was a U.S. representative from Indiana, father of Barclay Henley.

Born in Richmond, Indiana, Henley attended Indiana University at Bloomington. He studied law and was admitted to the bar in 1828 and commenced practice in Richmond, Indiana. He also engaged in banking. He served as a member of the State House of Representatives between 1832 and 1842 and served as speaker in 1840.

Henley was elected as a Democrat to the Twenty-eighth, Twenty-ninth, and Thirtieth Congresses (March 4, 1843 – March 3, 1849). He served as chairman of the Committee on Patents (Twenty-eighth and Twenty-ninth Congresses). He moved to California in 1849 and engaged in banking in Sacramento. He was an unsuccessful candidate for U.S. Senate in 1849, then served as a member of the first State Assembly between 1851 and 1853. He then served as Superintendent of Indian Affairs of California between 1855 and 1858, during which time he oversaw and instigated the Round Valley Settler Massacres of 1856–1859. His last job was as the postmaster of San Francisco between 1860 and 1864.

Henley died in Mendocino County, California. He was interred in Valley View Cemetery, Covelo, California.

U.S. House of Representatives
Preceded by Richard W. Thompson	Member of the U.S. House of Representatives from Indiana's 2nd congressional district 1843-1849	Succeeded by Cyrus L. Dunham
Political offices
Preceded by Edward Fitzgerald Beale	Superintendent of Indian Affairs for California; 1854–1859	Succeeded by James Y. McDuffie
