= Superintendencies of Indian Affairs =

A Superintendent of Indian Affairs was a regional administrator who supervised groups of Indian Agents who worked directly with individual tribes. It was the responsibility of the Superintendent to see that the Indian Agents complied with official government policy. The records for Superintendencies exist in the National Archives and in the Bureau of Indian Affairs; additionally, copies may be available in other official record storage or research facilities.

The position of Superintendent was abolished in 1878, after which agents of the Bureau of Indian Affairs reported directly to the Commissioner's Office in Washington, DC, at least until the BIA created Area Offices.

== The Superintendencies, Listed Alphabetically ==
Indian Affairs were, previous to 1824, a division of the War Department before being repositioned as a division of the Department of the Interior. The Bureau of Indian Affairs, both under the War Department and Department of the Interior, occasionally filed correspondence under the name of the Superintendency even after it had ceased to operate.

=== Arizona Superintendency ===
Established 1863; abolished 1873

Tribes:Pima, Papago, Maricopa, Tame Apache, Papago, Yavapai, Walapai, Havasupai, Mojave, Yuma, Moqui Pueblo and Scattered Apache

=== Arkansas Superintendency ===
Established 1819; abolished 1834; to Western Superintendency
Tribes: Cherokee, Quapaw, Choctaw, Osage, Shawnee, Caddo and Delaware

1825-1826 Quapaw removed to Caddo or Red River Agency

1834 Indians west of Arkansas were placed under the new Western Superintendency (Cherokee, Choctaw, Quapaw and others) as Most Indians had been removed from Arkansas

=== California Superintendency ===
Established 1852; abolished 1873

Tribes: Concow (Konkau), Hupa, Kern River (Tubatulabal), Wikchamni, Nomelaki, Kings River, Fresno, Kawia, Kianamaras, Mattole, Nuimok, Noi-sas, Pit River, Pomo, Whilkut (Redwood), Saia, Salan Pomo (Potter), Tejon, Tule (Tularenos) Mono, Wailaki, Wappo, Yupu, Yuki, Yurok (Klamath River), Yokaia (Ukiah), and the several tribes of Mission Indians.

=== Central Superintendency ===
Established 1851; abolished 1878; from St. Louis Superintendency

Tribes: Delaware, Shawnee, Wyandot, Kickapoo, Kansa, Sauk and Fox (of Mississippi and Missouri), Iowa, Potawatomi, Chippewa, Ottawa, Munsee, Peoria, Wea, Kaskaskia, Piankeshaw, Miami, Oto, Missouri, Omaha, Pawnee, Ponca, Kowa, Apache (Kiowa-Apache), Comanche, Cheyenne, Arapaho, and Sioux and others

=== Colorado Superintendency ===
Established 1861; abolished 1870

=== Dakota Superintendency ===
Established 1861; discontinued 1870; reestablished 1877; abolished 1878; from part of Central Superintendency

Bands of Sioux: Hunkpapa, Oglala, Yankton, Blackfee, Brule, Sisseton, Wahpeton, Yanktonai, San Arcs, Miniconjou, Two Kettles (Oohenonpa), Cut Head (Pabaska) and Santee

=== Florida Superintendency ===
Established 1824; abolished 1834

Tribes: Seminole

Agency: Seminole or Florida

Subagency: Apalachicola

=== Idaho Superintendency ===
Established 1863; abolished 1870

Tribes: Nez Perce, Shoshone, Bannock, Coeur d'Alene, Kutenai, Pend d'Oreille and Spokan

=== Iowa Superintendency ===
Established 1838; abolished 1846; to St. Louis Superintendency

Tribes Sac and Fox 1845 Sauk and Fox moved to the Osage River west of Missouri (now Kansas).

=== Michigan Superintendency ===
Established 1805; abolished 1851; to Northern Superintendency

Tribes: Chippewa, Ottawa, Potawatomi, Menominee, Winnebago, Wyandot, Seneca, Shawnee, Delaware, Miami, Oneida, Stockbridge, Munsee and Ottawa of Maumee

1832-1834 The Six Nations of New York were attached to the Michigan Superintendency

=== Minnesota Superintendency ===
Established 1849; abolished 1856; to Northern Superintendency

Tribes: Sioux, Chippewa, Winnebago, Assiniboin and Mandan

=== Missouri Superintendency ===
Established 1813; abolished 1848; duties transferred to St. Louis Superintendency after 1851

Existing records would be filed with the correspondence of the War Department

=== Montana Superintendency ===
Established 1864; abolished 1873

Tribes: Blackfeet, Piegan, Blood (Kainah), Grosventre, Flathead, Kutenai, Pend d'Oreille, Crow, Assiniboin and Bands of Sioux

=== Nevada Superintendency ===
Established 1861; abolished 1870

=== New Mexico Superintendency ===
Established 1850; abolished 1874

Tribes: Navajo, Southern Apache, Utah (Ute), Abiquiu (Ute and Jicarilla Apache), Conejos (Tabaquache Ute) Pueblo, Tucson (Pima, Papago, Maricopa and Apache), Cimarron (Jicarilla Apache and Moache Ute) and Mescalero

=== Northern Superintendency ===
Established 1851; abolished 1876; from Michigan and Wisconsin Superintendencies

Tribes: Chippewa, Ottawa, Potawatomi, Menominee, Oneida, Stockbridge, Mackinac, Omaha, Pawnee, Otoe (Oto and Missouri Indians), Great Nemaha (Sauk and Fox of Missouri and Iowa) and Winnebago

1863 many of the Winnebago and Sioux Indians moved to Dakota Territory

=== Oregon Superintendency ===
Established 1848; abolished 1873
Tribes: Umpqua, Umatilla, Cayuse, Wallawalla, Wasco. Shoshoni (Snake), Kalapuya, Clackamas, Rogue River, Warm Springs, Shasta, Klamath, Modoc, Paiute, Tenion, Nez Perce, Molala, Yamel, Joshua, Sixes (Kwatami), Chastacosta, Chetco and Bannock

=== Southern Superintendency ===
Established 1851; abolished 1870; from Western Superintendency

Tribes: Cherokee, Choctaw, Creek, Chickasaw, Seminole, Quapaw, Seneca and Mixed Band of Seneca and Shawnee, and Osage Indians of southern Kansas, Wichita and Kichai.

In 1859 Caddo, Anadarko, Waco Tonkawa, Hainai, Kichai, Tawakoni, Delaware, Shawnee and Comanche Indians were moved from Texas to Wichita Agency in Indian Territory

1861-1864 Indians loyal to U.S. fled to Kansas, after the Civil War the Indians began to return to Indian territory.

=== St. Louis Superintendency ===
Established 1822; abolished 1851; to Central Superintendency

=== Utah Superintendency ===
Established 1850; abolished 1870

Tribes: Ute, Shoshoni, Bannock, Paiute and Washo

=== Washington Superintendency ===
Established 1853; abolished 1874

Tribes: Makah, Skokomish, Yakima, Colville, Puyallup, Tulalip, Nisqualli, Nez Perce, Flathead, Spokan, Pend d'Oreille, Cayuse, Paloos, Wallawalla, Quinaielt, Blackfeet, Chehalix, Chilkat, Chinook, Clackamas, Clallam, Lake, Klikitat, Coeur d'Alene, Cowlitz. Dwamish, Lummi, Muckleshoot, Quileute, Quaitso (Queet), Squaxon and Swinomish

=== Western Superintendency ===
Established 1832; abolished 1851; to Southern Superintendency

Tribes: Choctaw, Cherokee, Creek, Osage, Seneca and Mixed Band of Seneca and Shawnee, Quapaw, Seminole Chickasaw, Caddo, Kiowa Comanche and others

1839 Chickasaw moved west - Oklahoma

=== Wisconsin Superintendency ===
Established 1836; abolished 1848; to Northern Superintendency

Tribes: Sauk and Fox, Winnebago, Chippewa, Menominee, Oneida, Stockbridge, Munsee, Sioux and Iowa

=== Wyoming Superintendency ===
Established 1869; abolished 1870

Tribes: Eastern Shoshoni, Bannock, Arapaho, Cheyenne and Sioux
