= Genocide of indigenous peoples =

Elimination of indigenous inhabitants

The genocide of indigenous peoples, colonial genocide, or settler genocide (Note: Other names proposed for the type of genocide often faced by indigenous peoples include "structural genocide" and "systemic genocide".) is the elimination of indigenous peoples as a part of the process of colonialism. (Note: Indigenous peoples are understood to be people whose historical and current territory has become occupied as a result of colonial expansion, or it has become occupied as a result of the formation of a state by a dominant group such as a colonial power.)

According to certain genocide experts, including Raphael Lemkin – who coined the term Genocide – colonialism is intimately connected with genocide. Lemkin saw genocide as a two-stage process: (1) the destruction of the targeted group's way of life, followed by (2) the perpetrators' imposition of their own national pattern. Other scholars view genocide as associated with but distinct from settler colonialism. The expansion of various Western European colonial powers such as the British and Spanish empires and the subsequent establishment of colonies on indigenous territories frequently involved acts of genocidal violence against indigenous groups in Europe, the Americas, Africa, Asia, and Oceania.

The designation of specific events as genocidal is frequently controversial. Lemkin originally intended a broad definition that encompassed colonial violence, but in order to pass the 1948 Genocide Convention, he narrowed his definition to physical and biological destruction (as opposed to cultural genocide) and added the requirement of genocidal intent. Although some scholars use the Genocide Convention definition, others have "criticized [it] as a highly flawed law for its overemphasis on intent, the imprecision of a key phrase 'destruction in whole or in part', and the narrow exclusivity of the groups protected"—factors which reduce its applicability to anti-indigenous violence.

== Genocide debate ==
The determination of whether a historical event should be considered a genocide is a matter of scholarly debate. Issues of contention include what construes genocidal intent and whether or not cultural destruction (sometimes called cultural genocide or "ethnic cleansing") constitutes genocide.

Some scholars narrowly define genocide so that it requires the intent to eliminate an entire group of people. Without this genocidal intent, a group or individual may commit "crimes against humanity" or "ethnic cleansing," but not genocide. Steven Katz defines genocide in the context of the Holocaust, arguing it requires the complete physical eradication of a group. He believes this distinguishes the Holocaust from other instances of violence against groups, including the genocide of Indigenous peoples.

=== Broader conceptions of genocide ===
Scholars focusing on genocides of Indigenous peoples criticize the view of the Holocaust as unique, arguing it diminishes the significance of Indigenous genocides, which are often seen as lesser or primitive and reinforce Eurocentrism. They believe this comparison undermines the moral standing of Indigenous survivors compared to Jewish survivors. There are differing views on genocide, with liberals focusing on intent and post-liberals on broader structural factors. Certain scholars and genocide experts draw on broader definitions of genocide such as Lemkin's, which considers colonialist violence against indigenous peoples inherently genocidal.

For Lemkin, genocide included all attempts to destroy a specific ethnic group, whether they are strictly physical, through mass killings, or whether they are strictly cultural or psychological, through oppression and through the destruction of indigenous ways of life.

A people group may continue to exist, but if it is prevented from perpetuating its group identity by prohibitions of its cultural and religious practices, practices which are the basis of its group identity, this may also be considered a form of genocide. Examples of this include the treatment of Tibetans and Uyghurs by the Government of China, the treatment of Native Americans by the United States Government, and the treatment of First Nations peoples by the Canadian government. Some modern scholars advocate for defining forcible assimilation, such as the Canadian residential schools, as genocide.

The concept of genocide was coined in 1944 by Raphael Lemkin:

New conceptions require new terms. By "genocide" we mean the destruction of a nation or of an ethnic group. This new word, coined by the author to denote an old practice in its modern development, is made from the ancient Greek word genos (race, tribe) and the Latin cide (killing), thus corresponding in its formation to such words as tyrannicide, homicide, infanticide, etc. Generally speaking, genocide does not necessarily mean the immediate destruction of a nation, except when accomplished by mass killings of all members of a nation. It is intended rather to signify a coordinated plan of different actions aiming at the destruction of essential foundations of the life of national groups, with the aim of annihilating the groups themselves. The objectives of such a plan would be the disintegration of the political and social institutions, of culture, language, national feelings, religion, and the economic existence of national groups, and the destruction of the personal security, liberty, health, dignity, and even the lives of the individuals belonging to such groups. Genocide is directed against the national group as an entity, and the actions involved are directed against individuals, not in their individual capacity, but as members of the national group.

Lemkin wrote: "Genocide has two phases: one, destruction of the national pattern of the oppressed group: the other, the imposition of the national pattern of the oppressor. This imposition, in turn, may be made upon the oppressed population which is allowed to remain, or upon the territory alone, after removal of the population and the colonization of the area by the oppressor's own nationals." Some genocide scholars separate the population declines of indigenous peoples which are due to disease from the genocidal aggression of one group towards another. Some scholars argue that an intent to commit a genocide is not needed, because a genocide may be the cumulative result of minor conflicts in which settlers, colonial agents or state agents perpetrate violent acts against minority groups. Others argue that the dire consequences of European diseases among many New World populations were exacerbated by different forms of genocidal violence, and they also argue that intentional deaths and unintentional deaths cannot easily be separated from each other. Some scholars regard the colonization of the Americas as genocide, since they argue it was largely achieved through systematically exploiting, removing and destroying specific ethnic groups, which would create environments and conditions for such disease to proliferate.

According to a 2020 study by Tai S. Edwards and Paul Kelton, recent scholarship shows "that colonizers bear responsibility for creating conditions that made natives vulnerable to infection, increased mortality, and hindered population recovery. This responsibility intersected with more intentional and direct forms of violence to depopulate the Americas... germs can no longer serve as the basis for denying American genocides."

Other scholars have said that the population decline cannot be explained by disease only. The vectors of death raised by displacement, warfare, slavery, and famine played an important role.

Ethnocide is a term also created by Lemkin in 1944, to describe the destruction of a people's culture. Lemkin did not see a clear distinction between ethnocide and genocide, both relating to the persecution of groups.

=== United Nations' definition of Genocide ===
The UN's 1948 definition, which is used in international law, is narrower than Lemkin's definition. Lemkin supported including cultural genocide in the Genocide Convention to protect groups tied to their culture. The term was excluded from the Genocide Convention due to objections from colonial states such as Australia, Canada, Sweden, the United Kingdom, and the United States. A draft by the UN Secretariat included a definition of cultural genocide, which encompassed acts intended to destroy a group's language, religion, or culture. The final version of Article 2 of the Genocide Convention did not mention cultural genocide. Instead, it included "forcible transfer of children from one group to another" as a punishable act.

According to the UN, for an act to be classified as genocide, it is essential to demonstrate that the perpetrators had a specific intent to physically destroy the group, in whole or in part, based on its real or perceived nationality, ethnicity, race, or religion. Intention to destroy the group's culture or intending to scatter the group does suffice. The following five acts comprise the physical element of the crime:

(a) "Killing members of the group;"
(b) "Causing serious bodily or mental harm to members of the group;"
(c) "Deliberately inflicting on the group conditions of life calculated to bring about its physical destruction in whole or in part;"
(d) "Imposing measures intended to prevent births within the group;"
(e) "Forcibly transferring children of the group to another group."

The United Nations' definition of genocide does not offer a broad enough explanation of all that goes into a genocide, especially in the case of indigenous peoples. The destruction of nonhuman animals, land, water, and other nonhuman beings constitute forms of genocide according to indigenous metaphysics.

== Indigenous peoples of Europe (pre-1947) ==
=== British colonization of Ireland ===
Ben Kiernan details how genocidal massacres were employed as a strategy in the colonisation of Ireland during the 16th century.

The numerous massacres and widespread starvation that accompanied the Cromwellian conquest of Ireland (1649–1653) has led to it being called a genocide by some nationalist historians; during the conquest over 200,000 civilians died due to the destruction of crops, forced displacement, and the mass killing of civilians, and about 50,000 Irish were sold into indentured servitude. In the aftermath of the conquest, thousands of native Irish were forcibly deported to Connacht in accordance with the Act for the Settlement of Ireland 1652. The Plantations of Ireland were attempts to expel the native Irish from the best land of the island, and settle it with loyal British Protestants; they too have been described as genocidal. The Great Famine (1845–1850) has also been blamed on British policy and called genocidal. Katie Kane has compared the Sand Creek massacre with the Drogheda massacre. R. Barry O'Brien compared the Irish Rebellion of 1641 with the American Indian Wars, writing "The slaughter of Irishmen was looked upon as literally the slaughter of wild beasts. Not only the men, but even the women and children who fell into the hands of the English were deliberately and systematically butchered. Year after year, over a great part of all Ireland, all means of human subsistence was destroyed, no quarter was given to prisoners who surrendered, and the whole population was skillfully and steadily starved to death."

=== Scandinavia ===
During the 19th and 20th centuries, the Norwegian and Swedish governments imposed assimilation policies on indigenous and minority peoples including as the Sámi, Kven and Forrest Finns.

=== Albanians ===
During the Balkan Wars, Serbia and Montenegro conducted an ethnic cleansing campaign against indigenous Albanians through the means of expulsions, massacres, and mutilation of Albanian civilians. The goal of these massacres was to alter the ethnic composition before the London Conference of 1912–1913 to determine the new Balkan borders, with generals reportedly claiming they were going to eradicate the Albanian population.

Following the Balkan Wars, massacres and deportations continued during World War I and the Interwar Period with the goal of colonizing Kosovo and to alter the demographics of the regions inhabited by Albanians.

== Indigenous peoples of the Americas (pre-1948) ==
It is estimated that during the initial Spanish conquest of the Americas, up to eight million indigenous people died, primarily through the spread of Afro-Eurasian diseases, wars, and atrocities. The population of Indigenous Americans is estimated to have decreased from approximately 145 million to around 7–15 million between the late 15th and late 17th centuries, representing a decline of around 90–95%.

Mistreatment and killing of Native Americans continued for centuries, in every area of the Americas, including the areas that would become Canada, the United States, Mexico, Argentina, Brazil, Paraguay, Chile. In the United States, some scholars (examples listed below) state that the American Indian Wars and the doctrine of manifest destiny contributed to the genocide, with one major event cited being the Trail of Tears.

In contrast, a 2019 book by Jeffrey Ostler at the University of Oregon has argued that genocide is not a majority viewpoint in the scholarship on the subject and he writes that,

Since 1992, the argument for a total, relentless, and pervasive genocide in the Americas has become accepted in some areas of Indigenous studies and genocide studies. For the most part, however, this argument has had little impact on mainstream scholarship in U.S. history or American Indian history. Scholars are more inclined than they once were to gesture to particular actions, events, impulses, and effects as genocidal, but genocide has not become a key concept in scholarship in these fields.

According to The Cambridge World History, The Oxford Handbook of Genocide Studies, and The Cambridge World History of Genocide, colonial policies in some cases included the deliberate genocide of indigenous peoples in North America. According to the Cambridge World History of Genocide, Spanish colonization of the Americas also included genocidal massacres.

According to Adam Jones, genocidal methods included the following:

- Genocidal massacres
- Biological warfare, using pathogens (especially smallpox and plague) to which the indigenous peoples had no resistance
- Spreading of disease via the 'reduction' of Indians to densely crowded and unhygienic settlements
- Slavery and forced/indentured labor, especially, though not exclusively, in Latin America, in conditions often rivaling those of Nazi concentration camps
- Mass population removals to barren 'reservations,' sometimes involving death marches en route, and generally leading to widespread mortality and population collapse upon arrival
- Deliberate starvation and famine, exacerbated by destruction and occupation of the native land base and food resources
- Forced education of indigenous children in White-run schools ...

=== Causes of indigenous deaths ===
According to scholars Tai S. Edwards and Paul Kelton, colonizers bear responsibility for creating conditions that made natives vulnerable to infection, increased mortality, and hindered population recovery. This responsibility intersected with more intentional and direct forms of violence to depopulate the Americas. It is false to blame indigenous deaths on the spread of germs and diseases when intentional and genocidal forces were at play. Kelton and Edwards explain that Native peoples "did not die from accidentally introduced 'virgin' soil epidemics. They died because U.S. colonization, removal policies, reservation confinement, and assimilation programs severely and continuously undermined physical and spiritual health. Disease was the secondary killer."

Some scholars view the term ethnic cleansing as a more appropriate designation. As detailed in Ethnic Cleansing: The Crime That Should Haunt America, historian Gary Anderson insists that genocide does not apply to any of American history since "policies of mass murder on a scale similar to events in central Europe, Cambodia, or Rwanda were never implemented" but argues that ethnic cleansing occurred.

Anthropologist David Maybury-Lewis insists that a categorization of a genocide is accurate due to the deliberate attempts to massacre entire societies and fatal circumstances imposed by the colonizers.

=== Categorization as a genocide ===
Historians and scholars whose work has examined this history in the context of genocide have included historian Jeffrey Ostler, historian David Stannard, anthropological demographer Russell Thornton (Cherokee Nation), historian Vine Deloria, Jr. (Standing Rock Dakota), as well as activists such as Russell Means (Oglala Lakota) and Ward Churchill. In his book, American Holocaust, Stannard compares the events of colonization in the Americas to the definition of genocide which is written in the 1948 UN convention, and he writes that,

In light of the U.N. language—even putting aside some of its looser constructions—it is impossible to know what transpired in the Americas during the sixteenth, seventeenth, eighteenth, and nineteenth centuries and not conclude that it was genocide.

Thornton describes the direct consequences of warfare, violence, and massacres as genocides, many of which had the effect of wiping out entire ethnic groups. Political scientist Guenter Lewy states that "even if up to 90 percent of the reduction in Indian population was the result of disease, that leaves a sizeable death toll caused by mistreatment and violence." The non-Indigenous ethnic studies professor Roxanne Dunbar-Ortiz states,

Proponents of the default position emphasize attrition by disease despite other causes equally deadly, if not more so. In doing so they refuse to accept that the colonization of America was genocidal by plan, not simply the tragic fate of populations lacking immunity to disease.

By 1900, the indigenous population in the Americas declined by more than 80%, and by as much as 98% in some areas. The effects of diseases such as smallpox, measles and cholera during the first century of colonialism contributed greatly to the death toll, while violence, displacement, and warfare against the Indians by colonizers contributed to the death toll in subsequent centuries. As detailed in American Philosophy: From Wounded Knee to the Present (2015),

It is also apparent that the shared history of the hemisphere is one which is framed by the dual tragedies of genocide and slavery, both of which are part of the legacy of the European invasions of the past 500 years. Indigenous people both north and south were displaced, died of disease, and were killed by Europeans through slavery, rape, and war. In 1491, about 145 million people lived in the western hemisphere. By 1691, the population of Indigenous Americans had declined by 90–95 percent, or by around 130 million people.

However, pre-Columbian population figures are difficult to estimate due to the fragmentary nature of the evidence. Estimates range from 8 to 112 million. Russel Thornton has pointed out that there were disastrous epidemics and population losses during the first half of the sixteenth century "resulting from incidental contact, or even without direct contact, as disease spread from one American Indian tribe to another." Thornton has also challenged higher indigenous population estimates, which are based on the Malthusian assumption that "populations tend to increase to, and beyond, the limits of the food available to them at any particular level of technology".

According to geographers from University College London, the colonization of the Americas by Europeans killed so many people, approximately 55 million people, or 90% of local populations, it resulted in climate change and global cooling. UCL Geography Professor Mark Maslin, one of the co-authors of the study, states that the large death toll also boosted the economies of Europe: "the depopulation of the Americas may have inadvertently allowed the Europeans to dominate the world. It also allowed for the Industrial Revolution and for Europeans to continue that domination."

The claim that the drastic population decline is an example of genocide is controversial, because scholars have argued about whether the process as a whole or whether specific periods and local processes qualify as genocide under the legal definition of it. Raphael Lemkin, the originator of the term "genocide", considered the colonial replacement of Native Americans by English and later British colonists to be one of the historical examples of genocide.

=== Spanish colonization of the Americas ===
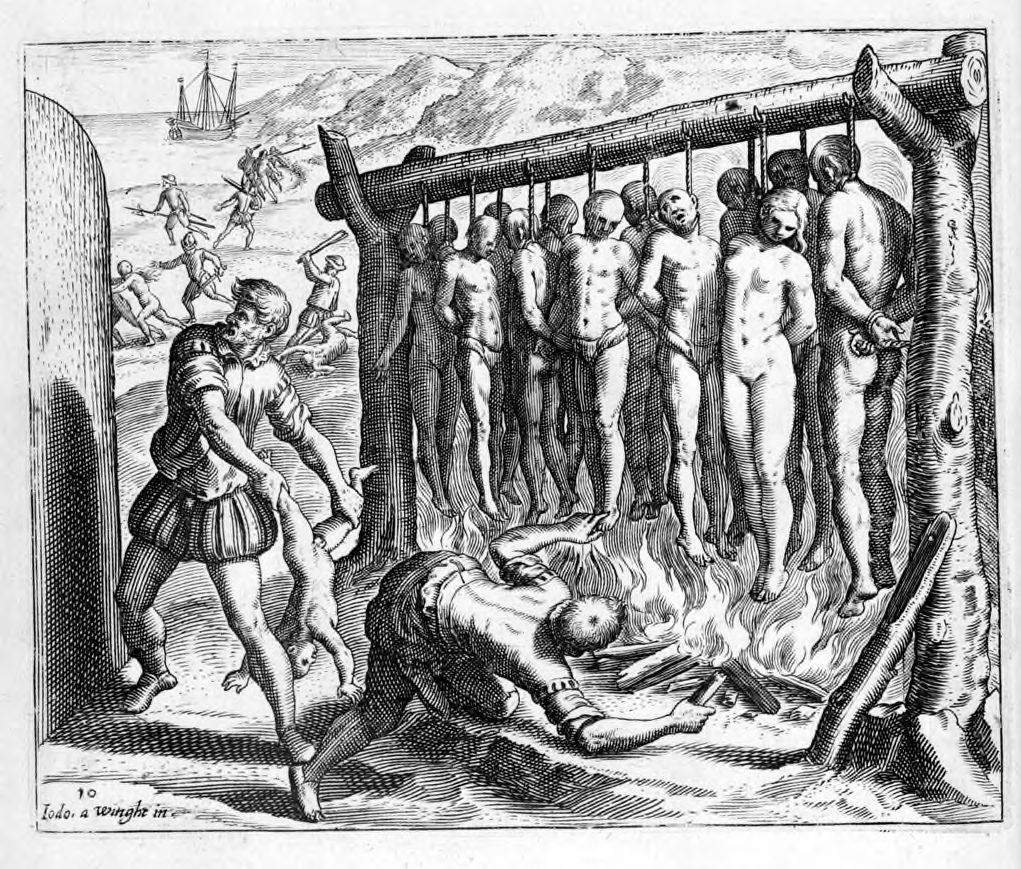
A 16th-century illustration by Flemish Protestant Theodor de Bry for Las Casas' Brevisima relación de la destrucción de las Indias, depicting Spanish torture of indigenous peoples during the conquest of Hispaniola. Bartolomé wrote: "They erected certain Gibbets, large, but low made, so that their feet almost reached the ground, every one of which was so ordered as to bear Thirteen Persons in Honour and Reverence (as they said blasphemously) of our Redeemer and his Twelve Apostles, under which they made a Fire to burn them to Ashes whilst hanging on them"

It is estimated that during the initial Spanish conquest of the Americas up to eight million indigenous people died, primarily through the spread of Afro-Eurasian diseases, in a series of events that have been described as the first large-scale act of genocide of the modern era.

Acts of brutality and systematic annihilation against the Taíno people of the Caribbean prompted Dominican friar Bartolomé de las Casas to write Brevísima relación de la destrucción de las Indias ('A Short Account of the Destruction of the Indies') in 1542—an account that had a wide impact throughout the western world as well as contributing to the abolition of indigenous slavery in all Spanish territories the same year it was written.

Las Casas wrote that the native population on the Spanish colony of Hispaniola had been reduced from 400,000 to 200 in a few decades. His writings were among those that gave rise to Spanish Black Legend, which Charles Gibson describes as "the accumulated tradition of propaganda and Hispanophobia according to which the Spanish Empire is regarded as cruel, bigoted, degenerate, exploitative and self-righteous in excess of reality".

Historian Andrés Reséndez at the University of California, Davis asserts that even though disease was a factor, the indigenous population of Hispaniola would have rebounded the same way Europeans did following the Black Death if it were not for the constant enslavement they were subject to. He says that "among these human factors, slavery was the major killer" of Hispaniola's population, and that "between 1492 and 1550, a nexus of slavery, overwork and famine killed more natives in the Caribbean than smallpox, influenza or malaria."

Noble David Cook said about the Black Legend conquest of the Americas: "There were too few Spaniards to have killed the millions who were reported to have died in the first century after Old and New World contact." Instead, he estimates that the death toll was caused by diseases like smallpox, which according to some estimates had an 80–90% fatality rate in Native American populations. However, historian Jeffrey Ostler has argued that Spanish colonization created conditions for disease to spread, for example, "careful studies have revealed that it is highly unlikely that members" of Hernando de Soto's 1539 expedition in the American South "had smallpox or measles. Instead, the disruptions caused by the expedition increased the vulnerability of Native people to diseases including syphilis and dysentery, already present in the Americas, and malaria, a disease recently introduced from the eastern hemisphere."

With the initial conquest of the Americas completed, the Spanish implemented the encomienda system in 1503. In theory, the encomienda placed groups of indigenous peoples under Spanish oversight to foster cultural assimilation and conversion to Catholicism, but in practice it led to the legally sanctioned forced labor and resource extraction under brutal conditions with a high death rate. Though the Spaniards did not set out to exterminate the indigenous peoples, believing their numbers to be inexhaustible, their actions led to the annihilation of entire tribes such as the Arawak. Many Arawaks died from lethal forced labor in the mines, where a third of workers died every six months. According to historian David Stannard, the encomienda was a genocidal system which "had driven many millions of native peoples in Central and South America to early and agonizing deaths."

The Spanish and Portuguese genocides of Indigenous Peoples of the Americas wiped out approximately 90% of the indigenous population, and most agriculture and infrastructure. According to ecologist Simon Lewis and geologist Mark Maslin, the scope of these genocides was so extensive that it prompted the global temperature decrease between 1550 and 1700 as forest regeneration resulted in additional carbon sequestration.

According to Clifford Trafzer, UC Riverside professor, in the 1760s, an expedition dispatched to fortify California, led by Gaspar de Portolà and Junípero Serra, was marked by slavery, forced conversions, and genocide through the introduction of disease.

According to sociologist Anibal Quijano, Bolivia and Mexico have undergone limited decolonialization through a revolutionary process. Quijano has described the colonial attacks on indigenous peoples, African slaves and people with mixed ethnicity:

A limited but real process of colonial (racial) homogenization, as in the Southern Cone (Chile, Uruguay, Argentina), by means of a massive genocide of the aboriginal population.
An always frustrated attempt at cultural homogenization through the cultural genocide of American Indians, blacks, and mestizos, as in Mexico, Peru, Ecuador, Guatemala, Central America, and Bolivia.

Quijano adds that in Colombia, nearly-exterminated indigenous peoples were replaced by African slaves, while black people are discriminated in Brazil, Venezuela and Colombia in a "racial democracy".

=== British colonization of the Americas ===
==== Beaver Wars ====
During the Beaver Wars of the seventeenth century, the Iroquois effectively destroyed several large tribal confederacies, including the Mohicans, Huron (Wyandot), Neutral, Erie, Susquehannock (Conestoga), and northern Algonquins, with the extreme brutality and exterminatory nature of the mode of warfare practiced by the Iroquois causing some historians to label these wars as acts of genocide committed by the Iroquois Confederacy.

==== Attempted extermination of the Pequot ====
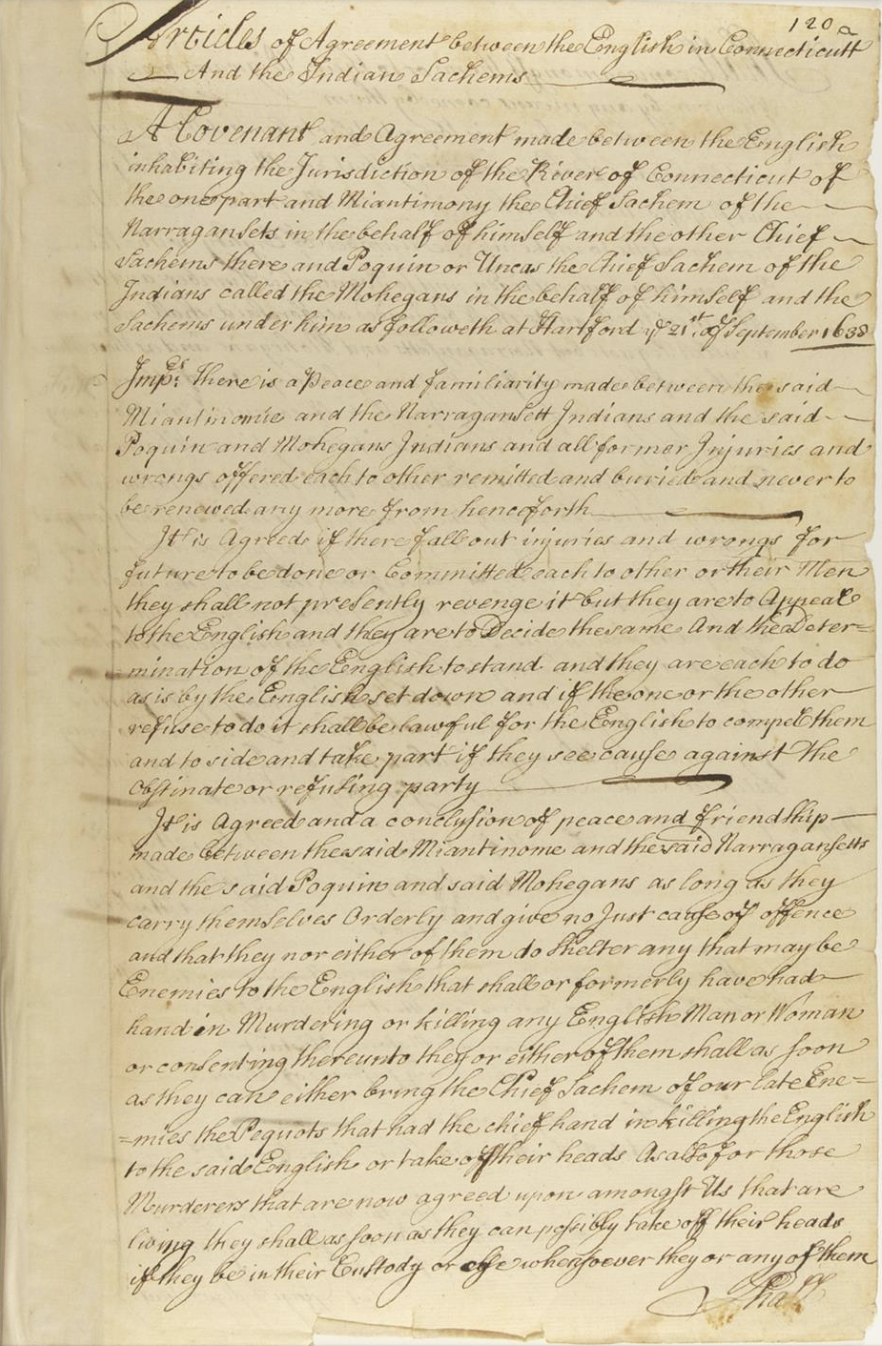
A 1743 copy of the Treaty of Hartford of 1638, through which English colonists sought to eradicate the Pequot cultural identity by prohibiting Pequot survivors of the war from returning to their lands, speaking their tribal language, or referring to themselves as Pequots.

The Pequot War was an armed conflict that took place between 1636 and 1638 in New England between the Pequot nation and an alliance of the colonists of the Massachusetts Bay, Plymouth, and Saybrook colonies and their allies from the Narragansett and Mohegan nations.

The war concluded with the decisive defeat of the Pequots. The colonies of Connecticut and Massachusetts offered bounties for the heads of killed hostile Indians, and later for just their scalps, during the Pequot War in the 1630s; Connecticut specifically reimbursed Mohegans for slaying the Pequot in 1637. At the end, about 700 Pequots had been killed or taken into captivity.

The English colonists imposed a harshly punitive treaty on the estimated 2,500 Pequots who survived the war; the Treaty of Hartford of 1638 sought to eradicate the Pequot cultural identity—with terms prohibiting the Pequots from returning to their lands, speaking their tribal language, or even referring to themselves as Pequots—and effectively dissolved the Pequot Nation, with many survivors executed or enslaved and sold away. Hundreds of prisoners were sold into slavery to colonists in Bermuda or the West Indies; other survivors were dispersed as captives to the victorious tribes. The result was the elimination of the Pequot nation as a viable polity in Southern New England, the colonial authorities classifying them as extinct. However, members of the Pequot nation still live today as a federally recognized tribe.

Scholars such as Michael Freeman and Benjamin Madley have concluded that the war was genocidal in nature, with Madley arguing that it set a precedent for colonial relations with Native Americans going forward.

==== Massacre of the Narragansett people ====
The Great Swamp Massacre was committed during King Philip's War by colonial militia of New England on the Narragansett people in December 1675. On 15 December of that year, Narraganset warriors attacked the Jireh Bull Blockhouse and killed at least 15 people. Four days later, the militias from the English colonies of Plymouth, Connecticut, and Massachusetts Bay were led to the main Narragansett town in South Kingstown, Rhode Island. The settlement was burned, its inhabitants (including women and children) killed or evicted, and most of the nation's winter stores destroyed. It is believed that at least 97 Narragansett warriors and 300 to 1,000 non-combatants were killed, though exact figures are unknown. The massacre was a critical blow to the Narragansett nation during the period directly following the massacre. However, much like the Pequot, the Narragansett people continue to live today as a federally recognized tribe.

==== French and Indian War and Pontiac's War ====
On 12 June 1755, during the French and Indian War, Massachusetts governor William Shirley issued a bounty of £40 for a male Indian scalp, and £20 for scalps of Indian females or of children under 12 years old. In 1756, Pennsylvania lieutenant-governor Robert Hunter Morris, in his declaration of war against the Lenni Lenape (Delaware) people, offered "130 Pieces of Eight, for the Scalp of Every Male Indian Enemy, above the Age of Twelve Years", and "50 Pieces of Eight for the Scalp of Every Indian Woman, produced as evidence of their being killed." During Pontiac's War, Colonel Henry Bouquet conspired with his superior, Sir Jeffrey Amherst, to infect hostile Native Americans through biological warfare with smallpox blankets.

=== Canada ===
A publication by the Truth and Reconciliation Commission of Canada

Throughout the history of Canada, the Canadian government, its colonial predecessors, and European settlers perpetrated systematic violence against Indigenous peoples that increasingly has been described as genocide, and cultural genocide. The treatment has also been described as ethnic cleansing and crimes against humanity. These collective actions included forced displacement, land dispossession, medical segregation, deliberate starvation policies, nutrition experiments, physical violence, and compulsory cultural assimilation programs.

=== Mexico ===
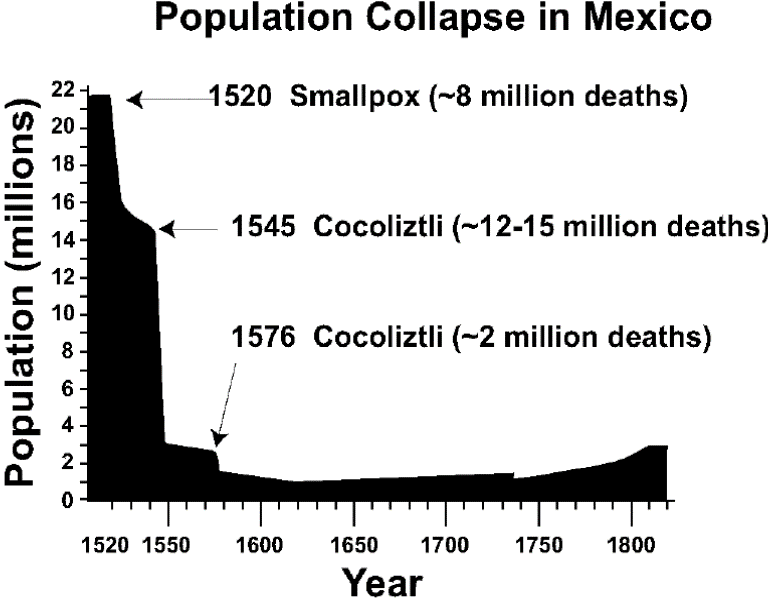
Graph of population decline in central Mexico caused by successive epidemics

==== Apaches ====
In 1835, the government of the Mexican state of Sonora put a bounty on the Apache which, over time, evolved into a payment by the government of 100 pesos for each scalp of a male 14 or more years old. In 1837, the Mexican state of Chihuahua also offered a bounty on Apache scalps, 100 pesos per warrior, 50 pesos per woman, and 25 pesos per child.

==== Mayas ====
The Caste War of Yucatán was caused by encroachment of colonizers on communal land of Mayas in Southeast Mexico. According to political scientist Adam Jones: "This ferocious race war featured genocidal atrocities on both sides, with up to 200,000 killed."

==== Yaquis ====
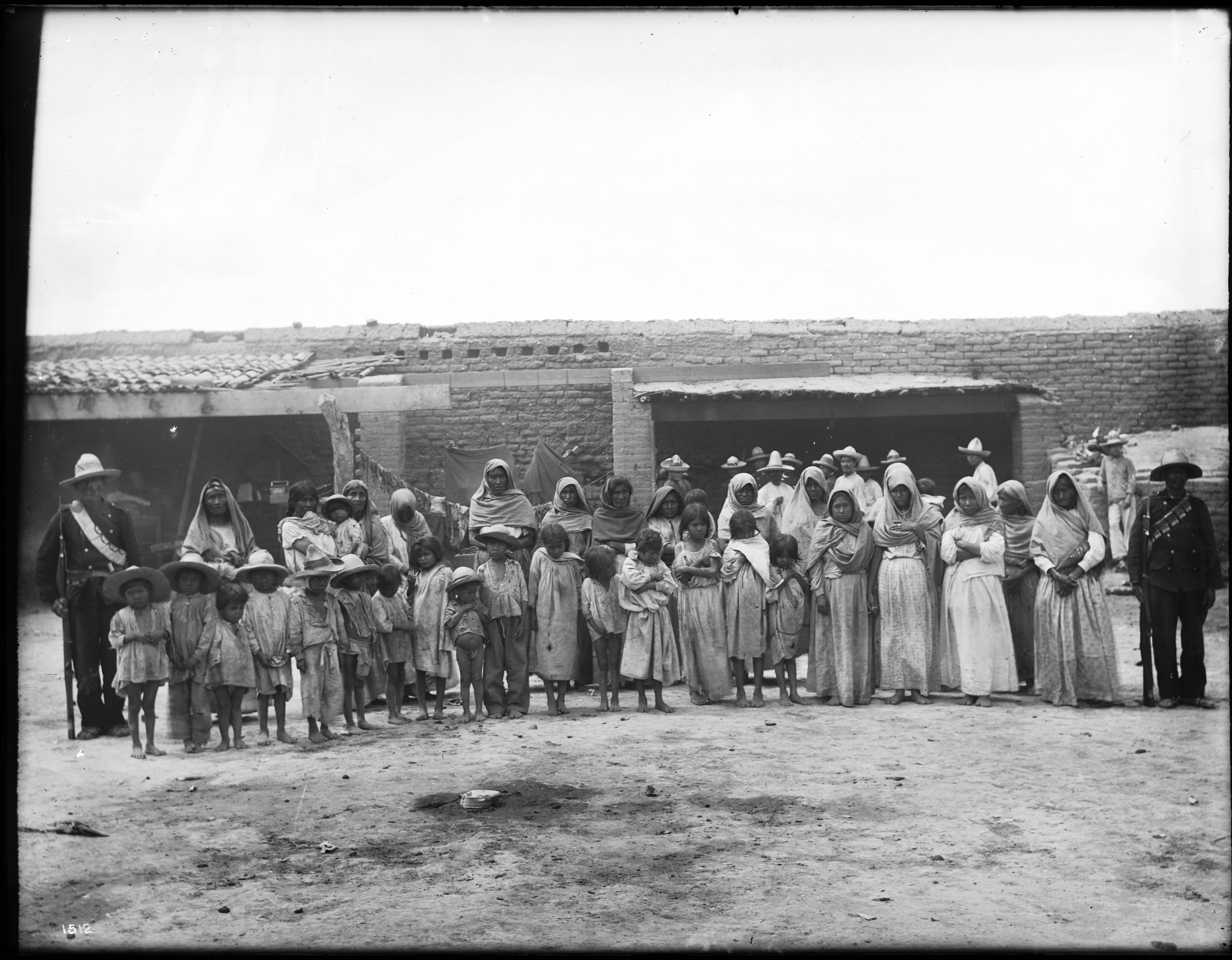
A group of more than 30 women and children Yaqui Indian prisoners under guard, Guaymas, Mexico, ca. 1910

The Mexican government's response to the various uprisings of the Yaqui nation have been likened to genocide particularly under Porfirio Diaz. Due to massacre, the population of the Yaqui nation in Mexico was reduced from 30,000 to 7,000 under Diaz's rule. One source estimates at least 20,000 out of these Yaquis were victims of state murders in Sonora.

=== Argentina ===
Argentina launched campaigns of territorial expansion in the second half of the 19th century, at the expense of indigenous peoples and neighbor state Chile. Mapuche people were forced from their ancestral lands by Argentinian military forces, resulting in deaths and displacements. During the 1870s, President Julio Argentino Roca implemented the Conquest of the Desert (Spanish: Conquista del desierto) military operation, which resulted in the subjugation, enslavement, and genocide of Mapuche individuals residing in the Pampas area.

In southern Patagonia, both Argentina and Chile occupied indigenous lands and waters, and facilitated the genocide implemented by sheep farmers and businessmen in Tierra del Fuego. Starting in the late 19th century, during the Tierra del Fuego gold rush, European settlers, in concert with the Argentine and Chilean governments, systematically exterminated the Selkʼnam people, Yaghan, and Haush peoples. Their decimation is known today as the Selknam genocide.

Argentina also expanded northward, dispossessing several Chaco peoples for example in the Napalpí massacre through a policy that may be considered as genocidal.

=== Chile ===
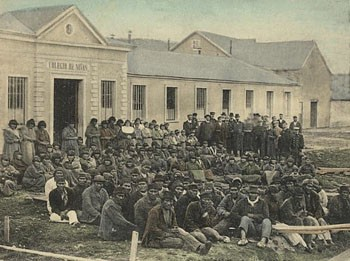
Prisoners in Dawson Island, Chile.

The so-called Pacification of the Araucania by the Chilean army dispossessed the up-to-then independent Mapuche people between the 1860s and the 1880s. First during the Arauco War and then during the Occupation of Araucanía, there was a long-running conflict with the Mapuche people, mostly fought in the Araucanía. Chilean settlers also participated in the Selknam genocide during the Tierra del Fuego gold rush.

=== Putumayo genocide ===
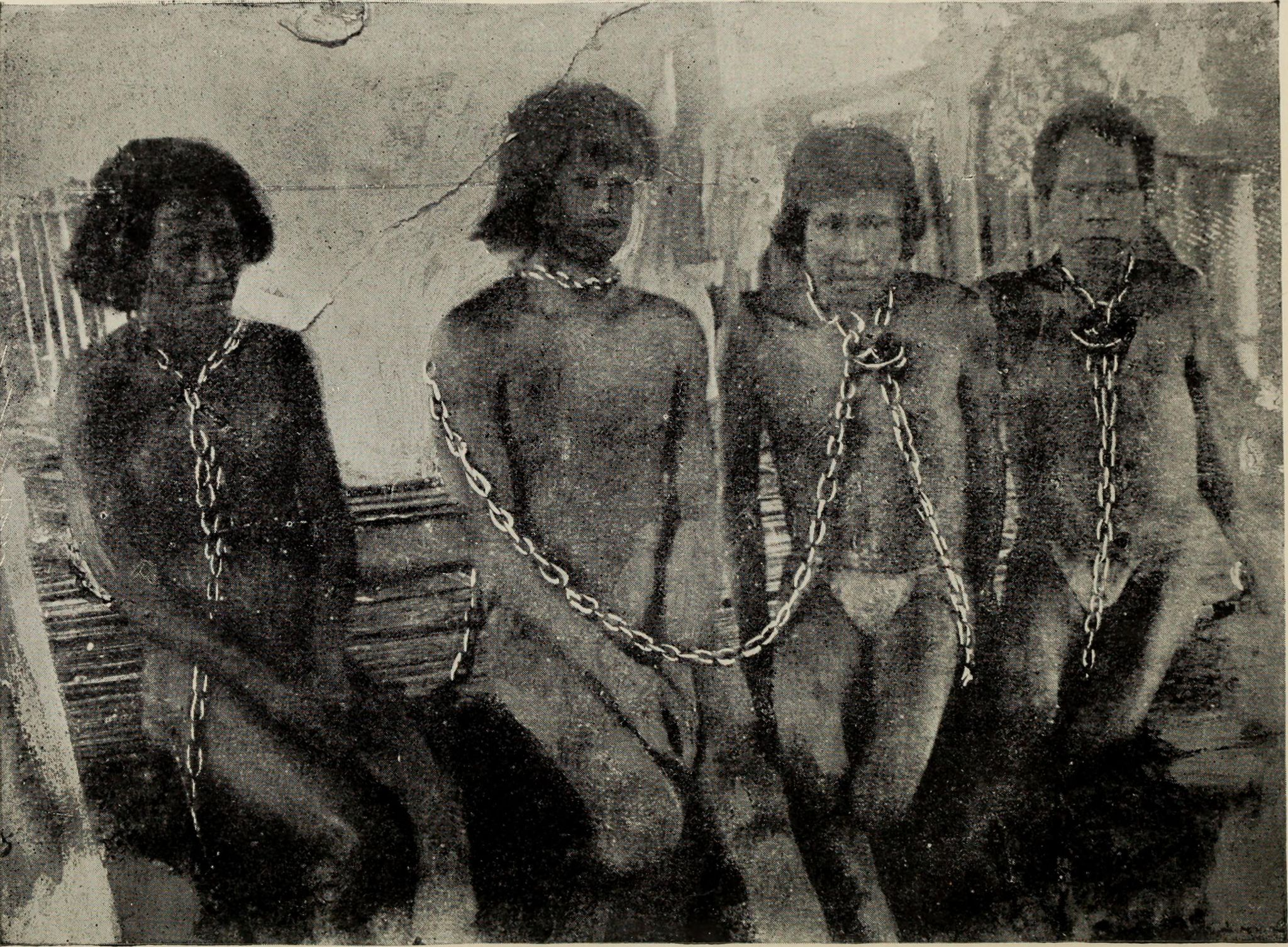
Amazonian Indians enslaved during the rubber boom in the Putumayo region of Peru

From 1879 to 1912, the world experienced a rubber boom. Rubber prices skyrocketed, and it became increasingly profitable to extract rubber from rainforest zones in South America and Central Africa. Rubber extraction was labor-intensive, and the need for a large workforce had a significant negative effect on the indigenous population across Brazil, Peru, Ecuador and Colombia and the Congo. The owners of the plantations or rubber barons were rich, but those who collected the rubber made very little, as a large amount of rubber was needed to be profitable. Rubber barons rounded up all the natives and forced them to tap rubber out of the trees. Slavery and gross human rights abuses were widespread, and in some areas, 90% of the indigenous population was wiped out. One plantation started with 50,000 indigenous peoples and when the killings were discovered, only 8,000 were still alive. These rubber plantations were part of the Brazilian rubber market which declined as rubber plantations in Southeast Asia became more effective.

Roger Casement, an Irishman travelling the Putumayo region of Peru as a British consul during 1910–1911, documented the abuse, slavery, murder, and use of stocks for torture against the native Indians: "The crimes charged against many men now in the employ of the Peruvian Amazon Company are of the most atrocious kind, including murder, violation, and constant flogging."

=== United States colonization of indigenous territories ===
Stacie Martin states that the United States has not been legally admonished by the international community for genocidal acts against its indigenous population, but many historians and academics describe events such as the Mystic massacre, the Trail of Tears, the Sand Creek massacre and the Mendocino War as genocidal in nature.

Roxanne Dunbar-Ortiz states that U.S. history, as well as inherited indigenous historical trauma, cannot be understood without dealing with the genocide that the United States committed against indigenous peoples. From the colonial period through the founding of the United States and continuing in the twentieth century, this has entailed torture, terror, sexual abuse, massacres, systematic military occupations, removals of indigenous peoples from their ancestral territories via Indian removal policies, forced removal of Native American children to military-like boarding schools, allotment, and a policy of termination.

The letters exchanged between Bouquet and Amherst during the Pontiac War show Amherst writing to Bouquet the indigenous people needed to be exterminated:

"You will do well to try to inoculate the Indians by means of blankets, as well as to try every other method that can serve to extirpate this execreble race."

Historians regard this as evidence of a genocidal intent by Amherst, as well as part of a broader genocidal attitude frequently displayed against Native Americans during the colonization of the Americas. When smallpox swept the northern plains of the U.S. in 1837, the U.S. Secretary of War Lewis Cass ordered that no Mandan (along with the Arikara, the Cree, and the Blackfeet) be given smallpox vaccinations, which were provided to other tribes in other areas.

The United States has to date not undertaken any truth commission nor built a memorial for the genocide of indigenous people. It does not acknowledge nor compensate for the historical violence against Native Americans that occurred during territorial expansion to the West Coast. American museums such as the Smithsonian Institution do not dedicate a section to the genocide. In 2013, the National Congress of American Indians passed a resolution to create a space for the National American Indian Holocaust Museum inside the Smithsonian, but it was ignored by the latter.

==== Sterilization of native women ====
The Family Planning Services and Population Research Act was passed in 1970, which subsidized sterilizations for patients receiving healthcare through the Indian Health Service. In the 1970-1976 period, 25% to 50% of Native American women have been sterilized by the Indian Health Service. Some of the procedures were performed under coercion, or without understanding by those sterilized. In 1977, Marie Sanchez, chief tribal judge of the Northern Cheyenne Indian Reservation told the United Nations Convention on Indigenous Rights in Geneva, that Native American women suffered involuntary sterilization which she equated with modern genocide.

==== Native American boarding schools ====
The Native American boarding school system was a 150-year program and federal policy that separated indigenous children from their families and sought to assimilate them into white society. It began in the early 19th century, coinciding with the start of Indian Removal policies. A Federal Indian Boarding School Initiative Investigative Report was published on 11 May 2022, which officially acknowledged the federal government's role in creating and perpetuating this system. According to the report, the U.S. federal government operated or funded more than 408 boarding institutions in 37 states between 1819 and 1969. 431 boarding schools were identified in total, many of which were run by religious institutions. The report described the system as part of a federal policy aimed at eradicating the identity of indigenous communities and confiscating their lands. Abuse was widespread at the schools, as was overcrowding, malnutrition, disease and lack of adequate healthcare. The report documented over 500 child deaths at 19 schools, although it is estimated the total number could rise to thousands, and possibly even tens of thousands. Marked or unmarked burial sites were discovered at 53 schools. The school system has been described as a cultural genocide and a racist dehumanization.

==== Indian Removal ====
Following the Indian Removal Act of 1830, the American government began forcibly relocating East Coast nations across the Mississippi. The removal included many members of the Cherokee, Muscogee (Creek), Seminole, Chickasaw, and Choctaw nations, among others in the United States, from their homelands to the Indian Territory in the eastern sections of the present-day state of Oklahoma. About 2,500–6,000 died along the Trail of Tears.

Chalk and Jonassohn assert that the deportation of the Cherokee nation along the Trail of Tears would almost certainly be considered an act of genocide today. The Indian Removal Act of 1830 led to the exodus. About 17,000 Cherokees, along with approximately 2,000 Cherokee-owned black slaves, were removed from their homes. The number of people who died as a result of the Trail of Tears has been variously estimated. American doctor and missionary Elizur Butler, who made the journey with one party, estimated 4,000 deaths.

Historians such as David Stannard and Barbara Mann have noted that the army deliberately routed the march of the Cherokee to pass through areas of a known cholera epidemic, such as Vicksburg. Stannard estimates that during the forced removal from their homelands, following the Indian Removal Act signed into law by President Andrew Jackson in 1830, 8,000 Cherokee died, about half the total population.

==== American Indian Wars ====
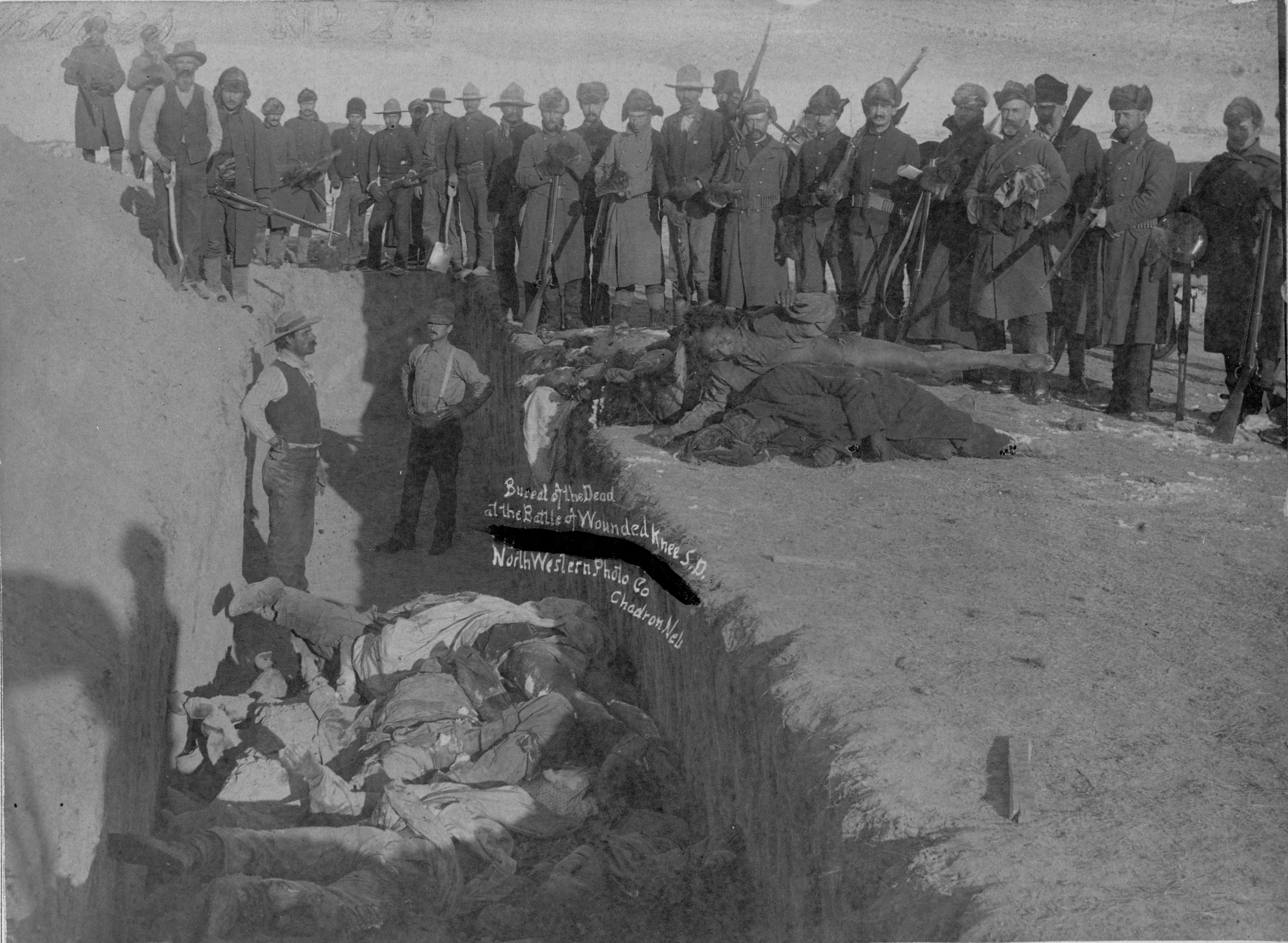
A mass grave being dug for frozen bodies from the 1890 Wounded Knee Massacre, in which the U.S. Army killed 150 Lakota people, marking the end of the American Indian Wars

During the American Indian Wars, the American Army carried out a number of massacres and forced relocations of indigenous peoples that are sometimes considered genocide. The 1864 Sand Creek Massacre, which caused outrage in its own time, has been regarded as a genocide. Colonel John Chivington led a 700-man force of Colorado Territory militia in a massacre of 70–163 peaceful Cheyenne and Arapaho, about two-thirds of whom were women, children, and infants. Chivington and his men took scalps and other body parts as trophies, including human fetuses and male and female genitalia. In defense of his actions, Chivington stated,

Damn any man who sympathizes with Indians! ... I have come to kill Indians, and believe it is right and honorable to use any means under God's heaven to kill Indians. ... Kill and scalp all, big and little; nits make lice.

— - Col. John Milton Chivington, U.S. Army

==== United States acquisition of California ====
The U.S. colonization of California started in earnest in 1845, with the Mexican–American War. With the 1848 Treaty of Guadalupe Hidalgo, it gave the United States authority over 525,000 square miles of new territory. In addition to the Gold Rush slaughter, there was also a large number of state-subsidized massacres by colonists against Native Americans in the territory, causing several entire ethnic groups to be wiped out.

In one such series of conflicts, the so-called Mendocino War and the subsequent Round Valley War, the entirety of the Yuki people was brought to the brink of extinction. From a previous population of some 3,500 people, fewer than 100 members of the Yuki nation were left. According to Russell Thornton, estimates of the pre-Columbian population of California may have been as high as 300,000.

By 1849, due to a number of epidemics, the number had decreased to 150,000. But from 1849 and up until 1890 the indigenous population of California had fallen below 20,000, primarily because of the killings. At least 4,500 California Indians were killed between 1849 and 1870, while many more perished due to disease and starvation. 10,000 Indians were also kidnapped and sold as slaves. In a speech before representatives of Native American peoples in June 2019, California governor Gavin Newsom apologized for the genocide. Newsom said, "That's what it was, a genocide. No other way to describe it. And that's the way it needs to be described in the history books."

One California law made it legal to declare any jobless Indian a vagrant, then auction his services off for up to four months. It also permitted whites to force Indian children to work for them until they were eighteen, provided that they first obtain permission from what the law referred to as a 'friend'. Whites hunted down adult Indians in the mountains, kidnapped their children, and sold them as apprentices for as little as $50. Indians could not complain in court because of another California statute that stated that 'no Indian or Black or Mulatto person was permitted to give evidence in favor of or against a white person'. One contemporary wrote, "The miners are sometimes guilty of the most brutal acts with the Indians... such incidents have fallen under my notice that would make humanity weep and men disown their race". The towns of Marysville and Honey Lake paid bounties for Indian scalps. Shasta City offered $5 for every Indian head brought to local authorities.

=== Brazil ===
Over 80 Brazilian nations disappeared between 1900 and 1957. During this period, out of a population of over one million, 80% had been killed through deculturalization, disease, or murder. It has also been argued that genocide has occurred during the modern era with the ongoing destruction of the Jivaro, Yanomami, and other nations.

== Indigenous peoples of Africa (pre-1948) ==
=== French colonization of Africa ===
==== Algeria ====
Over the course of the French conquest of Algeria and immediately after it, a series of demographic catastrophes ensued in Algeria between 1830 and 1871. Because the demographic crisis was so severe, Dr. René Ricoux, head of demographic and medical statistics at the statistical office of the General Government of Algeria, foresaw the simple disappearance of Algerian "natives as a whole". The demographic change in Algeria can be divided into three phases: an almost constant decline during the conquest period, up until its heaviest drop from an estimated 2.7 million in 1861 to 2.1 million in 1871, and finally moving into a gradual increase to a level of three million inhabitants by 1890. The causes range from a series of famines, diseases, and emigration to the violent methods used by the French army during their Pacification of Algeria, which historians argue constitute acts of genocide.

=== Congo Free State ===
Under Leopold II of Belgium, the population loss in the Congo Free State is estimated at sixty percent, up to 15 million people having been killed. The Congo Free State was hit especially hard by sleeping sickness and smallpox epidemics. The characterisation of the loss of life as "genocidal" is, however, a matter of debate among historians.

=== Spanish colonization of the Canary Islands ===
The conquest of the Canary Islands by the Crown of Castille took place between 1402 and 1496. Initially carried out by members of the Castilian nobility in exchange for a covenant of allegiance to the crown, the process was later carried out by the Spanish crown itself during the reign of the Catholic Monarchs. Various scholars have used the term "genocide" to describe the conquest of the Canary Islands. Mohamed Adhikhari argues that the Canary Islands were the scene of "Europe's first overseas settler colonial genocide", and that the mass killing and enslavement of natives, along with forced deportation, sexual violence and confiscation of land and children constituted an attempt to "destroy in whole" the Guanche people. The tactics used in the Canary Islands in the 15th century served as a model for the Iberian colonization of the Americas.

=== German South West Africa ===
Atrocities against the Indigenous African population by the German colonial empire can be dated to the earliest German settlements on the continent. The German colonial authorities carried out a genocide in German South-West Africa (GSWA) and incarcerated the survivors in concentration camps. It was also reported that, between 1885 and 1918, the indigenous population of Togo, German East Africa (GEA). and the Cameroons suffered from various human rights abuses, including starvation from scorched earth tactics and forced relocation for use as labor.

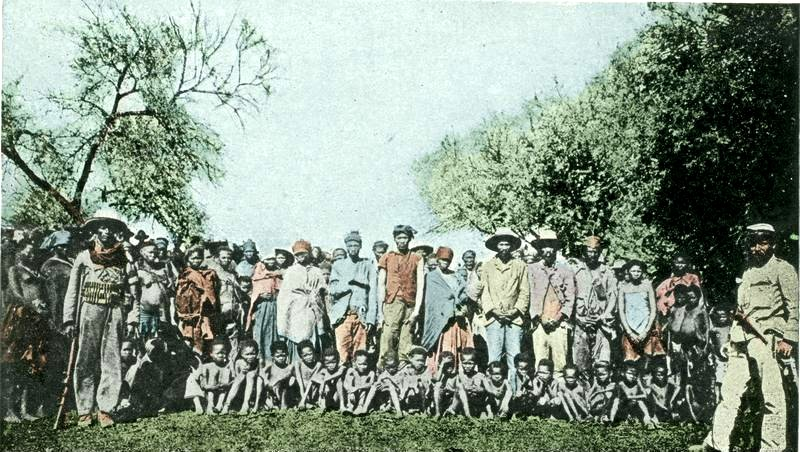
Prisoners in German Southwest Africa, 1899

The German Empire's action in GSWA against the Herero nation is considered by Howard Ball to be the first genocide of the 20th century. After the Herero, Nama and Damara began an uprising against the colonial government, General Lothar von Trotha, appointed as head of the German forces in GSWA by Emperor Wilhelm II in 1904, gave German forces the order to push them into the desert where they would die. Germany apologized for the genocide in 2004.

While many argue that the military campaign in Tanzania to suppress the Maji Maji Rebellion in GEA between 1905 and 1907 was not an act of genocide, as the military did not have as an intentional goal the deaths of hundreds of thousands of Africans, according to Dominik J. Schaller, the statement (Note: "As in all wars against uncivilized nations the systematic damage to hostile people's goods and chattels was indispensable in this case. The destruction of economic values like the burning of villages and food supplies might seem barbaric. If one considers, however, on the one hand, in what short time African Negro huts are erected anew and the luxuriant growth of tropic nature gives rise to new field crops, and on the other hand the subjection of the enemy was only possible through a procedure like this, then one will consequently take a more favourable view of this dira necessitas.") released at the time by Governor Gustav Adolf von Götzen did not exculpate him from the charge of genocide, but was proof that the German administration knew that their scorched earth methods would result in famine. 200,000 Africans are estimated to have died from famine, with some areas having been left completely and permanently devoid of human life.

=== Italian occupied Libya ===
The Pacification of Libya, also known as the Libyan Genocide or Second Italo-Senussi War, was a prolonged conflict in Italian Libya between Italian military forces and indigenous rebels associated with the Senussi Order that lasted from 1923 until 1932, when the principal Senussi leader, Omar Mukhtar, was captured and executed. The pacification resulted in mass deaths of the indigenous people in Cyrenaica—one quarter of Cyrenaica's population of 225,000 people died during the conflict. Italy committed major war crimes during the conflict; including the use of chemical weapons, episodes of refusing to take prisoners of war and instead executing surrendering combatants, and mass executions of civilians. Italian authorities committed ethnic cleansing by forcibly expelling 100,000 Bedouin Cyrenaicans, half the population of Cyrenaica, from their settlements that were slated to be given to Italian settlers. Italy apologized in 2008 for its killing, destruction and repression of the Libyan people during the period of colonial rule, and went on to say that this was a "complete and moral acknowledgement of the damage inflicted on Libya by Italy during the colonial era."

=== South Africa ===
After the establishment of the Dutch Cape Colony in 1652, the Dutch settlers and their Afrikaner descendants engaged in a series of conflicts against the indigenous San people. Over the centuries, thousands of San were massacred, while others were forced to work for the settlers. By the 1870s, the last San residing in the Cape region were hunted to extinction. The last government license to hunt San was reportedly issued in South West Africa (present-day Namibia) in 1936.

== Indigenous peoples of Asia (pre-1947) ==
=== Armenian genocide ===
The Armenian genocide was the systematic destruction of the Armenian people and identity in the Ottoman Empire during World War I. Spearheaded by the ruling Committee of Union and Progress (CUP), it was implemented primarily through the mass murder of around one million Armenians during death marches to the Syrian Desert and the forced Islamization of others, primarily women and children.

Before World War I, Armenians occupied a somewhat protected, but subordinate, place in Ottoman society. Large-scale massacres of Armenians had occurred in the 1890s and 1909. The Ottoman Empire suffered a series of military defeats and territorial losses—especially during the 1912–1913 Balkan Wars—leading to fear among CUP leaders that the Armenians would seek independence. During their invasion of Russian and Persian territory in 1914, Ottoman paramilitaries massacred local Armenians. Ottoman leaders took isolated instances of Armenian resistance as evidence of a widespread rebellion, though no such rebellion existed. Mass deportation was intended to permanently forestall the possibility of Armenian autonomy or independence.

On 24 April 1915, the Ottoman authorities arrested and deported hundreds of Armenian intellectuals and leaders from Constantinople. At the orders of Talaat Pasha, an estimated 800,000 to 1.2 million Armenians were sent on death marches to the Syrian Desert in 1915 and 1916. Driven forward by paramilitary escorts, the deportees were deprived of food and water and subjected to robbery, rape, and massacres. In the Syrian Desert, the survivors were dispersed into concentration camps. In 1916, another wave of massacres was ordered, leaving about 200,000 deportees alive by the end of the year. Around 100,000 to 200,000 Armenian women and children were forcibly converted to Islam and integrated into Muslim households. Massacres and ethnic cleansing of Armenian survivors continued through the Turkish War of Independence after World War I, carried out by Turkish nationalists.

This genocide put an end to more than two thousand years of Armenian civilization in eastern Anatolia. It enabled the creation of an ethnonationalist Turkish state, the Republic of Turkey. The Turkish government maintains that the deportation of Armenians was a legitimate action that cannot be described as genocide. As of 2023, 34 countries have recognized the events as genocide, concurring with the academic consensus.

The Armenian Genocide laid the groundwork for the Ottoman Empire to become more homogeneous. By the end of World War I, over 90 percent of the Armenians in the region were gone with most traces of their existence erased. The women and children survivors were frequently forced to give up their Armenian identities.

=== Assyrian genocide ===
Also known as the Sayfo (Syriac: ܣܲܝܦܵܐ, lit. 'sword'), the Assyrian genocide, was the mass murder and deportation of Assyrian/Syriac Christians in southeastern Anatolia and Persia's Azerbaijan province by Ottoman forces and some Kurdish tribes during and after World War I. Upwards of 250,000 Assyrians were killed during the period in which anti-Christian violence was carried out through mass executions, death marches, and starvation. The deportations, annihilation of entire communities, and forced conversions to Islam, permanently reshaped the demographics of the affected regions.

=== Russian tsarist conquest of Siberia ===
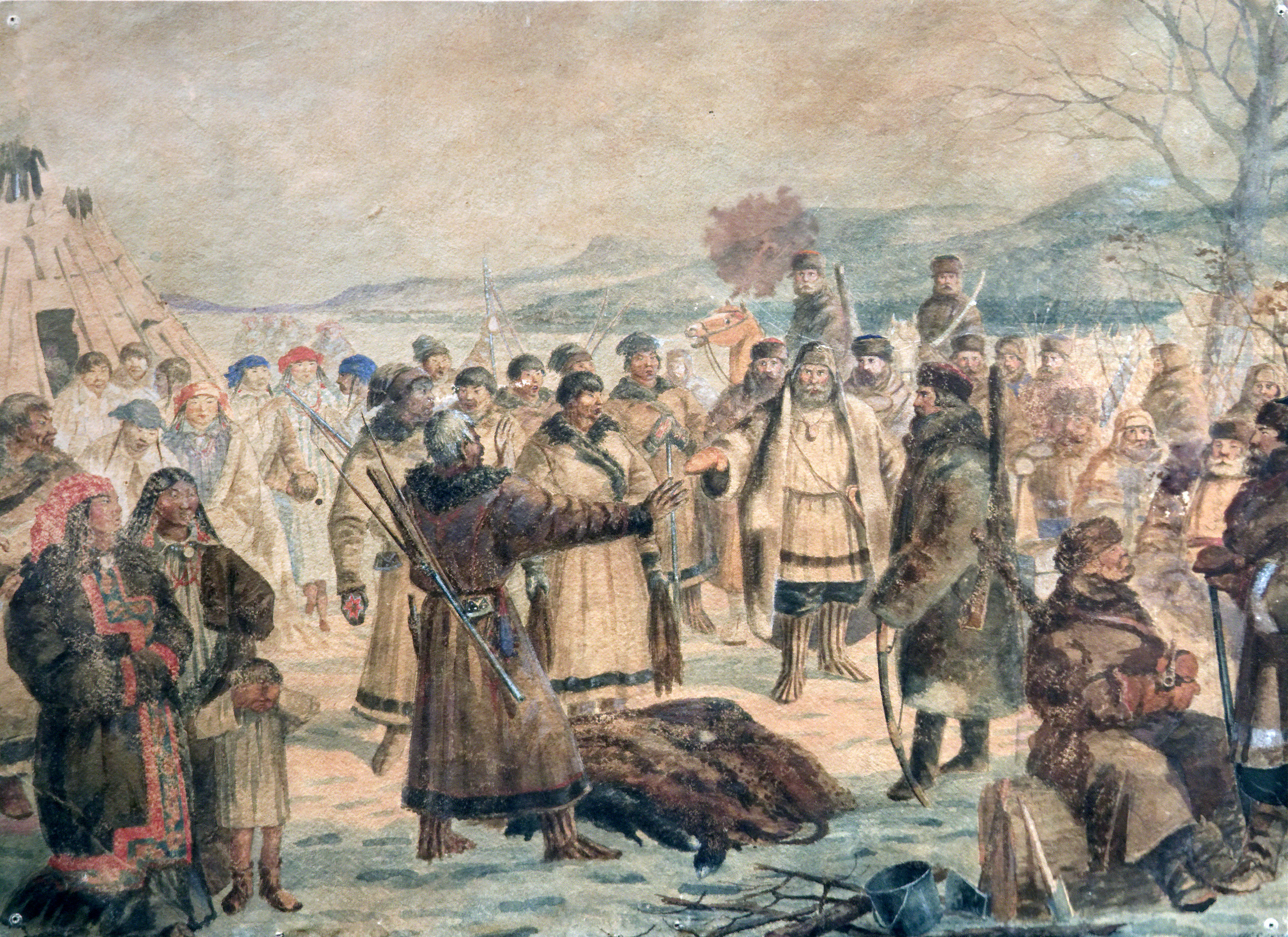
Cossacks collecting yasak in Siberia

The Russian conquest of Siberia was accompanied by massacres due to indigenous resistance to colonization by the Russian Cossacks, who savagely crushed the natives. At the hands of people like Vasilii Poyarkov in 1645 and Yerofei Khabarov in 1650, some peoples like the Daur were slaughtered by the Russians to the extent that it is considered genocide. In Kamchatka, out of a previous population of 20,000, only 8,000 remained after being subjected to half a century of Cossack slaughter.

In the 1640s the Yakuts were subjected to massacres during the Russian advance into their land near the Lena River, and on Kamchatka in the 1690s the Koryak, Kamchadals, and Chukchi were also subjected to massacres by the Russians. When the Russians did not obtain the demanded amount of fur tribute from the natives, Yakutsk Governor Peter Golovin, who was a Cossack, used meat hooks to hang the native men. In the Lena basin, 70% of the Yakut population died within 40 years, native women and children having been raped and enslaved in order to force the nation to pay the tribute.

In Kamchatka, the Russians savagely crushed the Itelmens uprisings against their rule in 1706, 1731, and 1741. The first time the Itelmen were armed with stone weapons and were unprepared. However, the second time, they used gunpowder weapons. The Russians faced tougher resistance when from 1745 to 1756 they tried to exterminate the gun and bow-equipped Koraks until their victory. The Russian Cossacks also faced fierce resistance and were forced to give up when trying unsuccessfully to wipe out the Chukchi through genocide in 1729, 1730–1731, and 1744–1747.

After the Chukchi defeated the Russians in 1729, Russian commander Major Pavlutskiy waged war against them. Chukchi women and children were mass-slaughtered and enslaved in 1730–1731. Empress Elizabeth ordered the Chukchis and the Koraks be genocided in 1742 to totally expel them from their native lands and erase their culture through war. Her command was that the natives be "totally extirpated", with Pavlutskiy leading the war from 1744 to 1747. The Chukchi ended the campaign and forced the Russian army to give up by killing Pavlitskiy and decapitating him.

The Russians also waged war and slaughtered the Koraks in 1744 and 1753–1754. After the Russians tried to force them to convert to Christianity, the different native peoples (the Koraks, Chukchis, Itelmens, and Yukagirs) all united to drive them out of their land in the 1740s, culminating in the assault on Nizhnekamchatsk fort in 1746.

Nowadays, Kamchatka is European in demographics and culture. Indigenous Kamchatkans only make up 2.5% of the population, which accounts for around 10,000 people out of a previous number of 150,000. The genocide committed by the Cossacks, as well as the fur trade which devastated local wildlife, exterminated much of the Native population. In addition, the Cossacks also devastated the local wildlife by slaughtering massive numbers of animals for fur. Between the eighteenth and the nineteenth century, 90% of the Kamchadals and half of the Vogules were killed. The rapid genocide of the indigenous population led to entire ethnic groups being entirely wiped out, with around 12 exterminated groups which could be named by Nikolai Iadrintsev as of 1882.

In the Aleutian islands, the Aleut natives were subjected to genocide and slavery by the Russians for the first 20 years of Russian rule, Aleut women and children being captured by the Russians and Aleut men slaughtered.

The Russian colonization of Siberia and the treatment of the indigenous peoples has been compared to the European colonization of the Americas, with similar negative impacts on the Indigenous Siberians as upon indigenous peoples of the Americas. One of these commonalities is the appropriation of indigenous peoples' land.

=== Empire of Japan ===
==== Colonization of Hokkaido ====
The Ainu are an indigenous people in Japan, specifically Hokkaido. In a 2009 news story, Japan Today reported, "Many Ainu were forced to work, essentially as slaves, for Wajin (ethnic Japanese), resulting in the breakup of families and the introduction of smallpox, measles, cholera and tuberculosis into their community. In 1869, the new Meiji government renamed Ezo as Hokkaido and unilaterally incorporated it into Japan. It banned the Ainu language, took Ainu land away, and prohibited salmon fishing and deer hunting."

Roy Thomas wrote: "Ill treatment of native peoples is common to all colonial powers, and, at its worst, leads to genocide. Japan's native people, the Ainu, have, however, been the object of a particularly cruel hoax, as the Japanese have refused to accept them officially as a separate minority people."

Anthropologist Ann-Elise Lewallen wrote in 2016 that the Japanese colonisation of lands inhabited by the Ainu had "genocidal consequences" for the Ainu, and that the Ainu were made indigenous through the "invasion and colonial subjugation of their ancestral lands, lifeways, and attempted genocide of their ancestors". Lewallen, alongside researchers Robert Hughes and Esther Brito Ruiz have detailed how the assimilationist policies of Japan from the 19th century has resulted in a cultural genocide of the Ainu, where their existence was only permitted if they ceased being Ainu. Historian Michael Roellinghoff described the bureaucratic mechanisms that sort to assimilate the Ainu into Japanese society and erase their distinct identity as "insidiously genocidal". In "Hokkaidō 150: settler colonialism and Indigeneity in modern Japan and beyond" historian Tristan Grunow et al. detail how the Ainu of Hokkaido were subjected to a process of settler colonialism and genocidal practices that align with the genocidal actions detail in the United Nations Genocide Convention.

==== Colonization of Ryukyu ====
Ryukyuans are an indigenous people to the islands to the west of Japan, originally known as the Ryukyu Islands. With skeletons dating back 32,000 years, the Okinawan or Ryukyu people have a long history on the islands that includes a kingdom of its own known as the Ryukyu Kingdom. The kingdom established trade relationships with China and Japan that began in the late 1500s and lasted until the 1860s.

In the 1590s, Japan made its first attempt at subjecting the Ryukyu Kingdom by sending a group of 3,000 samurai armed with muskets to conquer the Ryukyu Kingdom. Indefinite take over was not achieved; however, the Ryukyu Kingdom became an acting colony of Japan. As a result, it paid homage to the Japanese while feigning their own independence to China to maintain trade.

In 1879, after a small rebellion by the Ryukyu people was squelched, the Japanese government (the Ryukyu people had requested help from China to break all bonds from Japan) punished Ryukyu by officially naming it a state of Japan and re branding the kingdom as Okinawa. Much like the Ainu, Ryukyuans were punished for speaking their own language, forced to identify with Japanese myths and legends (forgoing their own legends), adopt Japanese names, and reorient their religion around the Japanese Emperor. Their homeland was also renamed Okinawa. Japan had officially expanded their colonization to the Okinawan islands, where natives didn't play a significant role in Japan's history until the end of World War II.

When America brought the war to Japan, the first area that was effected were the Okinawan Islands. Okinawan citizens forced into becoming soldiers were told that Americans would take no prisoners. In addition to the warnings, Okinawans were given a grenade per household, its use reserved in case Americans gained control of the island, with the standing orders to have a member of the household gather everyone and pull the pin for mass suicide. Okinawans were told this was to avoid the "inevitable" torture that would follow any occupation. In addition, the Japanese army kicked any natives out of their homes that weren't currently serving in the army (women and children included) and forced them into open, unprotected, spaces such as beaches and caves. These happened to be the first places the Americans arrived on the island. As a result, more than 120,000 Okinawans (between a quarter and a third of the population) died, soldiers and civilians alike. Americans took over the island and the war was soon over. America launched its main base in Asia from Okinawa and the Emperor of Japan approved, giving Okinawa to America for an agreed 25–50 years to move the majority of Americans out of mainland Japan. In the end, Americans stayed in Okinawa for 74 years, without showing any signs of leaving. During the occupation, Okinawan natives were forced to give up their best cultivating land to Americans which they keep to this day.

Issues in Okinawa have yet to be resolved regarding the expired stay of American soldiers. Although Okinawa was given back to Japan, the American base still stays. The Japanese government has yet to take action, despite Okinawans raising the Issue. However, this is not the only problem that the Japanese government has refused to take action on. Okinawans were ruled an indigenous people in 2008 by the committee of the United Nations (UN), in addition to their original languages being recognized as endangered or severely endangered by the United Nations Educational, Scientific, and Cultural Organization (UNESCO). The UN has encouraged that Okinawan history and language be mandatorily taught in schools in Okinawa, but nothing has been done so far. Okinawans are still in a cultural struggle that matches that of the Ainu people. They are not allowed to be Japanese-Okinawan, with Japanese being the only nationally or legally accepted term.

=== Vietnamese conquest of Champa ===
The Cham and Vietnamese had a long history of conflict, with many wars ending due to economic exhaustion. It was common that the antagonists of the wars would rebuild their economies simply to go to war again. In 1471, Champa was particularly weakened prior to the Vietnamese invasion by a series of civil wars. The Vietnamese conquered Champa and settled its territory with Vietnamese migrants during the march to the south after fighting repeated wars with Champa, shattering Champa in the invasion of Champa in 1471 and finally completing the conquest in 1832 under Emperor Minh Mang. 100,000 Cham soldiers besieged a Vietnamese garrison which led to anger from Vietnam and orders to attack Champa. 30,000 Chams were captured and over 40,000 were killed.

=== Qing dynasty ===
==== Dzungar genocide ====
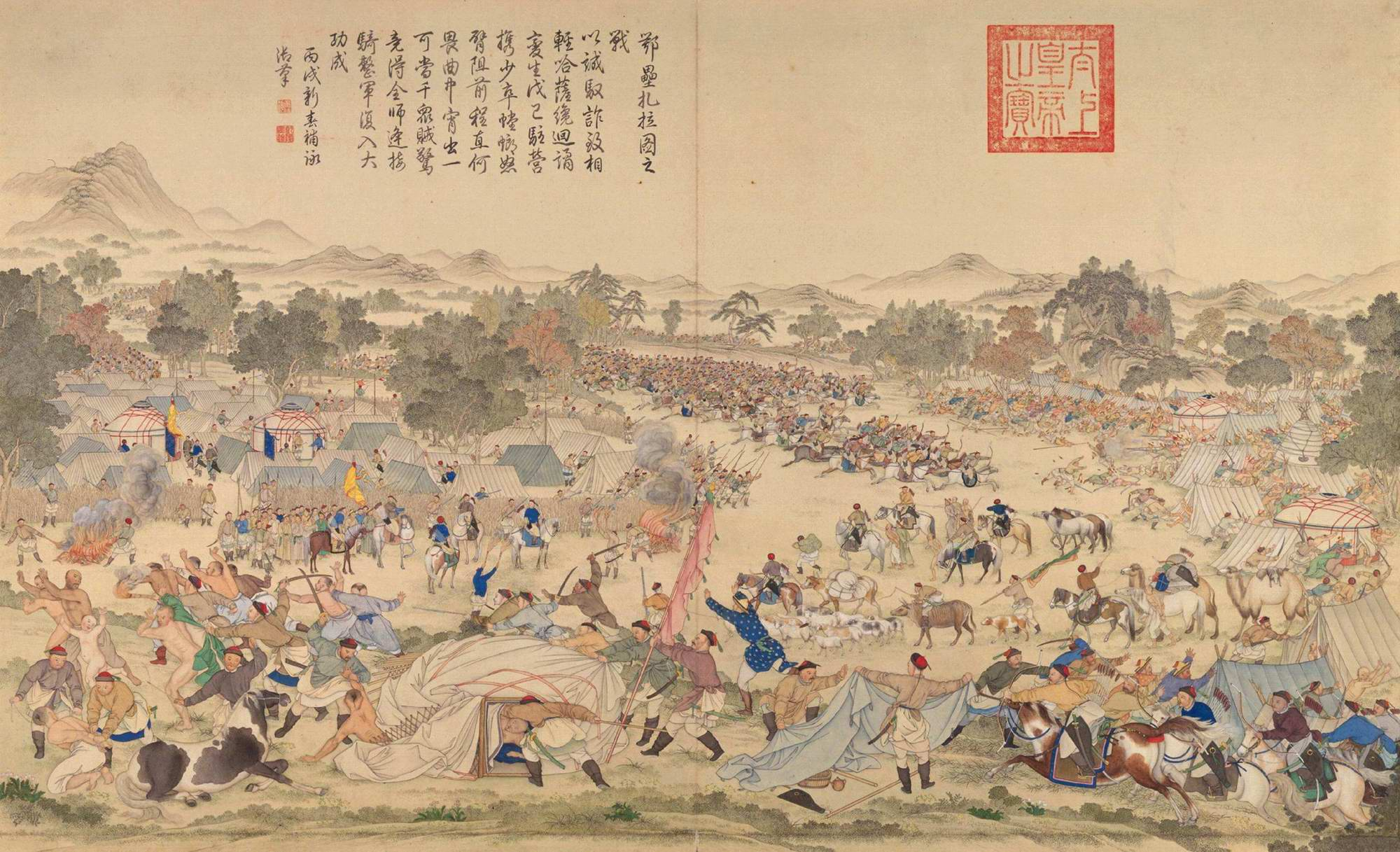
The massacre of Oroi-Jalatu, 1756. Manchu general Zhao Hui attacked the Dzungars at night.

Some scholars estimate that about 80% of the Dzungar (Western Mongol) population (600,000 or more) was destroyed by a combination of warfare and disease in the Dzungar genocide perpetrated during the Qing conquest of the Dzungar Khanate (1755–1757). There, Manchu Bannermen and Khalkha Mongols exterminated the Dzungar Oirat Mongols. Mark Levene, a historian whose recent research interests focus on genocide, has stated that the extermination of the Dzungars was "arguably the eighteenth-century genocide par excellence".

Anti-Zunghar Uyghur rebels from the Turfan and Hami oases had submitted to Qing rule as vassals and requested Qing help for overthrowing Zunghar rule. Uyghur leaders like Emin Khoja were granted titles within the Qing nobility, and these Uyghurs helped supply the Qing military forces during the anti-Zunghar campaign. The Qing employed Khoja Emin in its campaign against the Dzungars and used him as an intermediary with Muslims from the Tarim Basin to inform them that the Qing were only aiming to kill Oirats (Zunghars) and that they would leave the Muslims alone, and also to convince them to kill the Oirats (Dzungars) themselves and side with the Qing since the Qing noted the Muslims' resentment of their former experience under Zunghar rule at the hands of Tsewang Araptan.

=== Bandanese massacre ===
Under the command of Jan Pieterszoon Coen, Dutch soldiers and Japanese mercenaries massacred and enslaved thousands of Bandanese islanders and destroyed several villages in order to force the natives to surrender.

=== March across Samar ===
During the Philippine–American War, on 28 September 1901, Filipino forces defeated and nearly wiped out a US company in the Battle of Balangiga. In response, US forces carried out widespread atrocities during the March across Samar, which lasted from December, 1901 to February, 1902. US forces killed between 2,000 and 2,500 Filipino civilians, according to most sources, and carried out an extensive scorched-earth policy, which included burning down villages. Some Filipino historians have called these killings genocidal. U.S. Brigadier General Jacob H. Smith instructed his soldiers to "kill everyone over ten years old", including children who were capable of bearing arms, and to take no prisoners. However, Major Littleton Waller, commanding officer of a battalion of 315 US Marines, refused to follow his orders. Some Filipino historians estimate higher at 5,000 killed during the campaign, while other estimates are as high as 50,000, albeit the higher estimates have since been discredited, and are now known to be a result of typographical errors and the misreading of documents.

=== Famines in British India ===
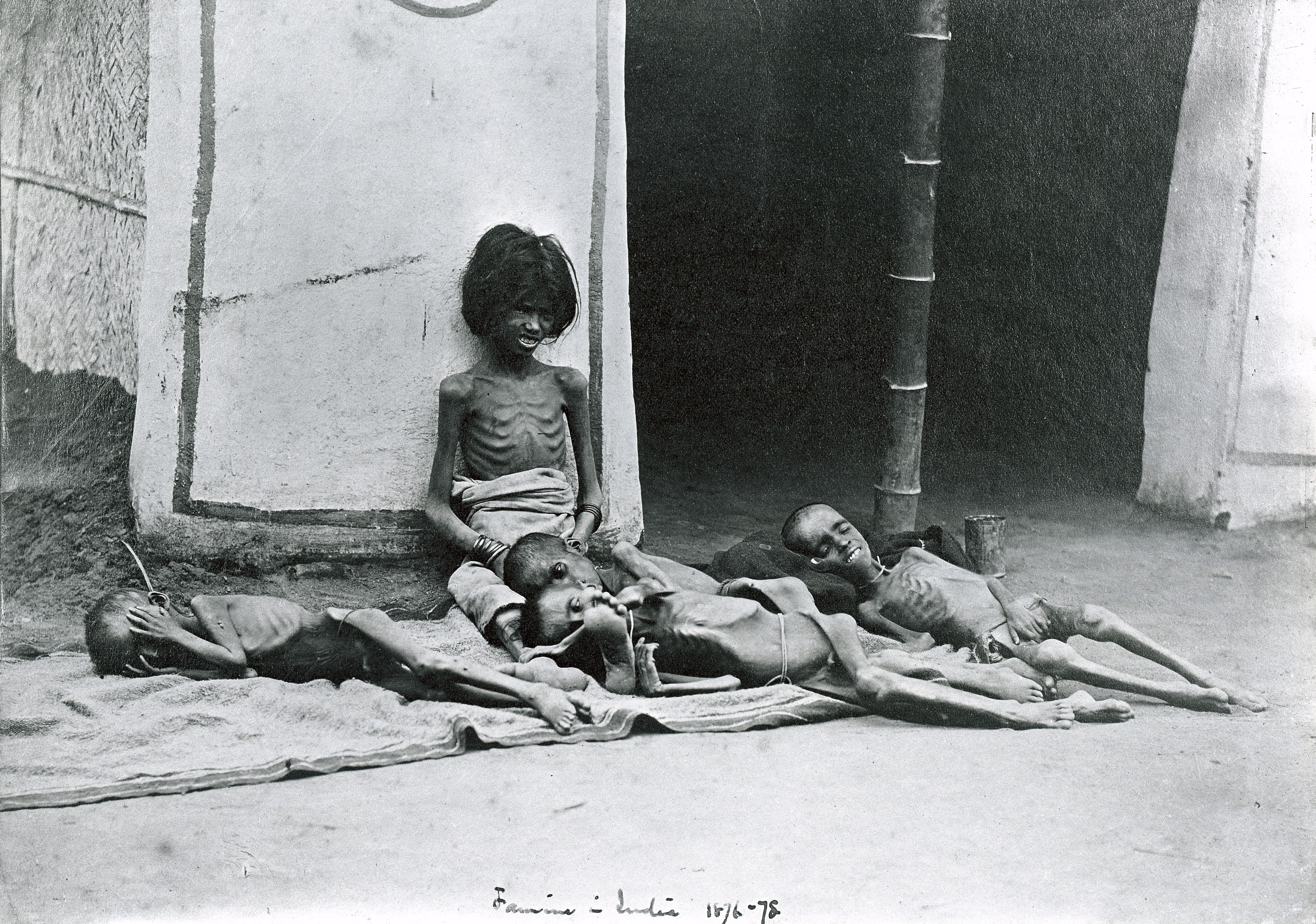
Victims of the Great Famine of 1876–78

Late Victorian Holocausts: El Niño Famines and the Making of the Third World is a book by Mike Davis about the connection between political economy and global climate patterns, particularly El Niño-Southern Oscillation (ENSO). By comparing ENSO episodes in different time periods and across countries, Davis explores the impact of colonialism and the introduction of capitalism, and the relation with famine in particular. Davis argues that "Millions died, not outside the 'modern world system', but in the very process of being forcibly incorporated into its economic and political structures. They died in the golden age of Liberal Capitalism; indeed, many were murdered... by the theological application of the sacred principles of Smith, Bentham and Mill."

Davis characterizes the Indian famines under the British Raj as "colonial genocide". Some scholars, including Niall Ferguson, have disputed this judgment, while others, including Adam Jones, have affirmed it.

== Indigenous peoples of Oceania (pre-1945) ==
=== Australia ===
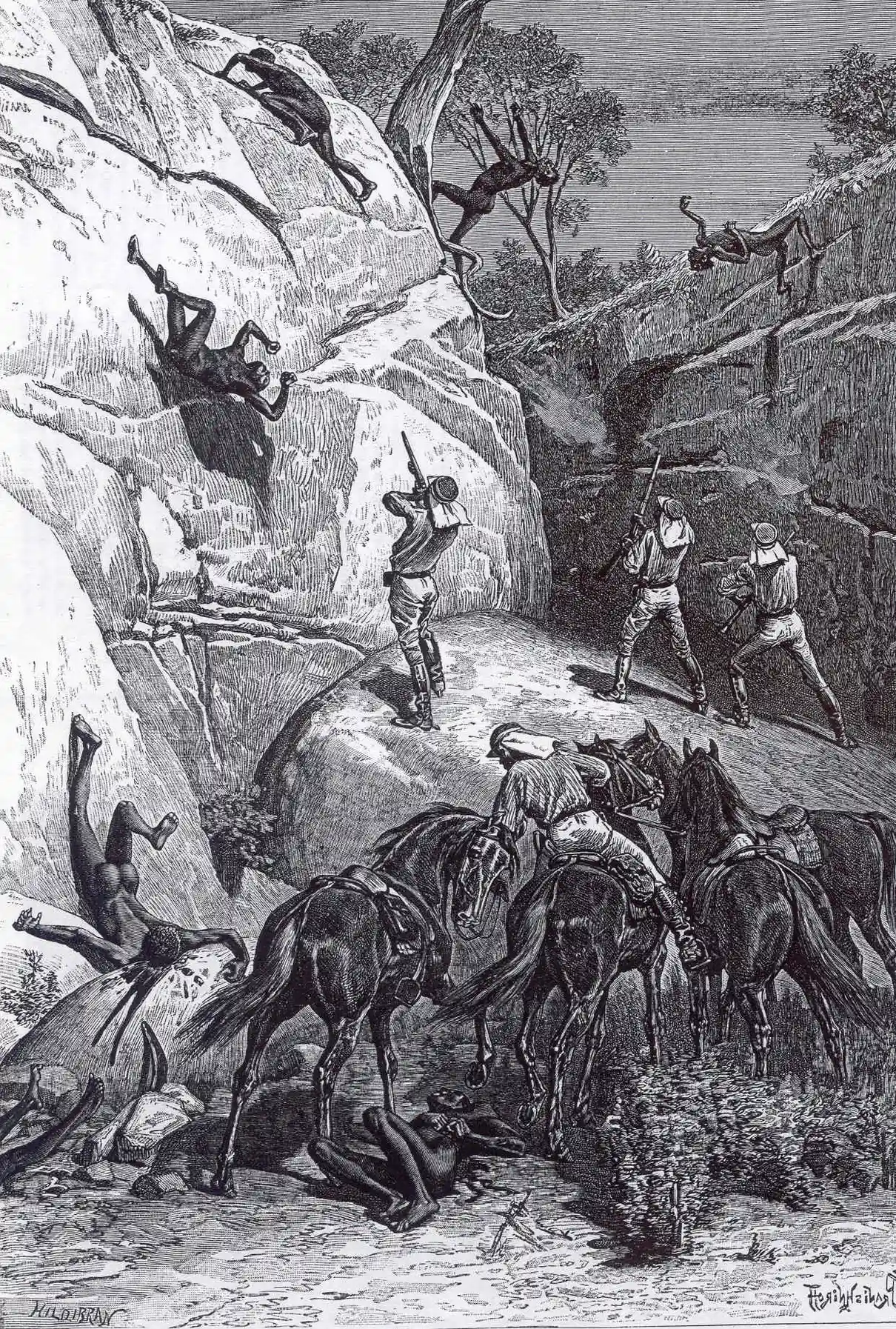
An 1888 drawing of a massacre by Queensland's native police at Skull Hole, Mistake Creek, Australia.

In a similar manner to the United States and Canada, the British colonization of Australia was conducted under the pretense of indigenous lands being deemed "empty" in order to justify their acquisition of Aboriginal lands and deny them sovereignty or property rights. Colonization also caused a large decrease in the indigenous population from war, newly introduced diseases, massacre by colonists, and attempts at forced assimilation. The European settlers grew rapidly in number and created entirely new societies. The Aboriginal population became an oppressed minority in their own country. The overall gradual violent expansion of colonies into indigenous land during the Australian frontier wars lasted for centuries. Australia enacted the genocidal policy of "breeding out the colour" in the 1930s.

The virtual extinction of the Aboriginal Tasmanians is regarded as a classic case of near genocide by Lemkin, most comparative scholars of genocide, and many general historians, including Robert Hughes, Ward Churchill, Leo Kuper and Jared Diamond, who base their analysis on previously published histories. Between 1824 and 1908 White settlers and Native Mounted Police in Queensland, according to Raymond Evans, killed more than 10,000 Aboriginal people, who were regarded as vermin and sometimes even hunted for sport.

Prior to the arrival of the First Fleet in 1788, which marked the beginning of Britain's colonization of Australia, the Aboriginal population had been estimated by historians to be around roughly 500,000 people; by 1900, that number had plummeted to fewer than 50,000. While most died due to the introduction of infectious diseases that accompanied colonization, up to 20,000 were killed during the Australian frontier wars by British settlers and colonial authorities through massacres, mass poisonings and other actions. Ben Kiernan, an Australian historian of genocide, treats the Australian evidence over the first century of colonization as an example of genocide in his 2007 history of the concept and practice, Blood and Soil: A World History of Genocide and Extermination from Sparta to Darfur. Historian Niall Ferguson has referred to the case in Tasmania as follows: "In one of the most shocking of all the chapters in the history of the British Empire, the Aborigines in Van Diemen's Land were hunted down, confined, and ultimately exterminated: an event which truly merits the now overused term 'genocide'.", and mentions Ireland and North America as areas that suffered ethnic cleansing at the hands of the British. According to Patrick Wolfe in the Journal of Genocide Research, the "frontier massacring of indigenous peoples" by the British constitutes a genocide. Widespread population decline occurred following conquest principally from introduction of infectious disease. However, as the total population of Aboriginal people was unknown at the time of colonisation it is impossible to determine the number of lives lost only that population declines continued well into the 20th century.

The Australian practice of removing the children of Aboriginal and Torres Strait Islander descent from their families throughout most of the 20th century, which is known as The Stolen Generations, has been described as genocidal. The 1997 report Bringing Them Home, which examined the fate of the Stolen Generations" concluded that the forced separation of Aboriginal children from their family constituted an act of genocide. In the 1990s a number of Australian institutions, including the state of Queensland, apologized for its policies regarding forcible separation of Aboriginal children. A national apology was also delivered by the then Prime Minister Kevin Rudd in 2008.

Another allegation against the Australian state is the use of medical services to Aboriginal people to administer contraceptive therapy to Aboriginal women without their knowledge or consent, including the use of Depo Provera, as well as tubal ligations. Both forced adoption and forced contraception would fall under the provisions of the UN genocide convention. Aboriginal Australians were only granted the right to vote in some states in 1962. Some Australian scholars, including historians Geoffrey Blainey and Keith Windschuttle and political scientist Ken Minogue, reject the view that Australian Aboriginal policy was genocidal.

=== New Zealand ===
During the intertribal Musket Wars, members of two Māori tribes arrived in the Chatham Islands, where they massacred and enslaved the indigenous Moriori people. In the aftermath of the genocide, the Native Land Court awarded the Maori invaders ownership of the Chatham islands in 1870 and denied the Moriori any sovereignty over the islands.

=== Blackbirding in the Pacific Islands ===
Throughout the 19th century, several Pacific Islander nations such as Fiji, New Caledonia and Easter Island fell victim to foreign diseases such as smallpox and measles as a result of blackbirding by European and American colonists. The Peruvian slave raids in particular led to the near extinction of the Rapa Nui people of Easter Island and the depopulation of ʻAta in Tonga.

== Contemporary examples ==
The genocide of indigenous ethnic groups is still an ongoing feature in the modern world, with the ongoing depopulation of the Jivaro, Yanomami, and other ethnic groups in Brazil having been described as genocide. Multiple incidents of rioting against the minority communities in Afghanistan, Bangladesh, Pakistan, Sri Lanka, Myanmar and India have been documented. Paraguay has also been accused of carrying out a genocide against the Aché whose case was brought before the Inter-American Human Rights Commission. The commission gave a provisional ruling that genocide had not been committed by the state but expressed concern over "possible abuses by private persons in remote areas of the territory of Paraguay". Yazadi genocide in Iraq remains a case of major concern.

Hitchcock and Twedt say that even though genocidal actions against indigenous peoples continue, most states and even the United Nations avoid criticizing other nations for this.

=== Bangladesh ===
According to Amnesty International and Reference Services Review, the indigenous Chakma people of the Chittagong hill tracts were allegedly subjected to genocidal violence between the 1970s and the 1990s. Their population had been dwindling since the military rule launched by dictator Major General Ziaur Rahman, who took control of the country after a military coup in 1975 and reigned from 1975 to 1981. Later, his successor Lieutenant General HM Ershad who reigned from 1982 to 1990. In response, the Chakma rebels led by M.N. Larma (killed in 1983) started an insurgency in the region in 1977. The Bangladeshi government had settled hundreds of thousands of Bengali people in the region who now constitute the majority of the population there. On 11 September 1996, the indigenous rebels reportedly abducted and killed 28 to 30 Bengali woodcutters. After democracy was reestablished in the country, fresh rounds of talks began in 1996 with the newly elected prime minister Sheikh Hasina Wajed of the Awami League, the daughter of the late Father of the Nation Sheikh Mujibur Rahman and the representatives of the indigenous rebels. A peace treaty was signed between the government and the indigenous people on 2 December 1997, ending the 20-year-long insurgency and all hostilities in the region.

=== Brazil ===
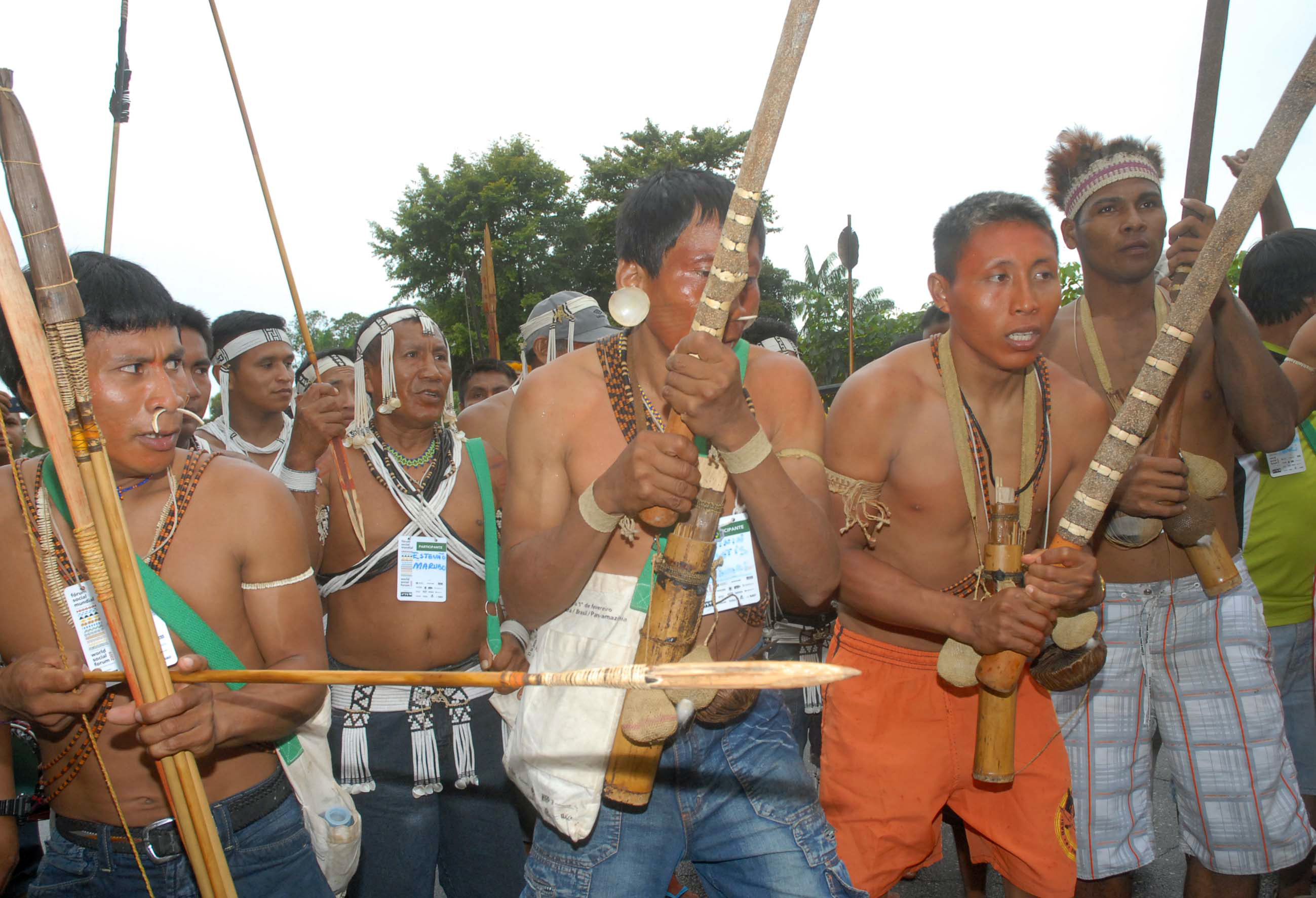
Indigenous protesters from Vale do Javari in Belém

From the late 1950s until 1968, the state of Brazil submitted their indigenous peoples to violent attempts to integrate, pacify and acculturate their communities. In 1967, public prosecutor Jader de Figueiredo Correia submitted the Figueiredo Report to the then-ruling dictatorship. The report, which comprised seven thousand pages, was not released until 2013. It documents genocidal crimes against the indigenous peoples of Brazil, including mass murder, torture, bacteriological and chemical warfare, reported slavery, and sexual abuse. The rediscovered documents are being examined by the National Truth Commission which has been tasked with the investigations of human rights violations that occurred between 1947 and 1988. The report reveals that the Indian Protection Service (IPS) had enslaved indigenous people, tortured children, and stolen land. The Truth Commission considers that entire tribes in Maranhão were eradicated and that in Mato Grosso an attack on 30 Cinturão Largo left only two survivors. The report also states that landowners and members of the IPS had entered isolated villages and deliberately introduced smallpox. Of the 134 people accused in the report, the state has until date not tried a single one, since the Amnesty Law passed in the end of the dictatorship does not allow trials for abuses that happened in that period. The report also details instances of mass killings, rapes, and torture, Figueiredo stated that the actions of the IPS had left indigenous peoples near extinction. The state abolished the IPS following the release of the report. The Red Cross launched an investigation after further allegations of ethnic cleansing were made after the IPS had been replaced.

=== Canada ===
From 2016 to 2019, the Canadian government conducted the National Inquiry into Missing and Murdered Indigenous Women. The final report of the inquiry concluded that the high level of violence directed at First Nations, Inuit, and Metis women and girls is "caused by state actions and inactions rooted in colonialism and colonial ideologies." The National Inquiry commissioners said in the report and publicly that the MMIWG crisis is "a Canadian genocide." It also concluded that the crisis constituted an ongoing "race, identity and gender-based genocide".

External videos
- "B.C.'s infamous Highway of Tears" (2006) - CBC Archives, (2:32, min)

The MMIWG inquiry used a broader definition of genocide from the Crimes Against Humanity and War Crimes Act which encompasses "not only acts of commission, but 'omission' as well." The inquiry described the traditional legal definition of genocide as "narrow" and based on the Holocaust. According to the inquiry, "colonial genocide does not conform with popular notions of genocide as a determinate, quantifiable event" and concluded that "these [genocidal] policies fluctuated in time and space, and in different incarnations, are still ongoing."

=== China ===
==== Tibet ====
On 5 June 1959, Shri Purshottam Trikamdas, Senior Advocate of the Indian Supreme Court presented a report on Tibet to the International Commission of Jurists (an NGO):

From the facts stated above the following conclusions may be drawn: ... (e) To examine all such evidence obtained by this Committee and from other sources and to take appropriate action thereon and in particular to determine whether the crime of Genocide – for which already there is strong presumption – is established and, in that case, to initiate such action as envisaged by the Genocide Convention of 1948 and by the Charter of the United Nations for suppression of these acts and appropriate redress;

According to the Tibet Society of the UK, "In all, over one million Tibetans, a fifth of the population, had died as a result of the Chinese occupation right up until the end of the Cultural Revolution."

=== Colombia ===
In the protracted conflict in Colombia, groups such as the Awá, Wayuu, Pijao, and Paez people have become subjected to intense violence by right-wing paramilitaries, leftist guerrillas, and the Colombian army. Drug cartels, international resource extraction companies and the military have also used violence to force the indigenous groups out of their territories. The National Indigenous Organization of Colombia argues that the violence is genocidal in nature, but others question whether there is a "genocidal intent" as required in international law.

=== Congo (DRC) ===
In the Democratic Republic of Congo, genocidal violence against the indigenous Mbuti, Lese, and Ituri peoples has reportedly been endemic for decades. During the Congo Civil War (1998–2003), Pygmies were hunted down and eaten by both sides in the conflict, who regarded them as subhuman. Sinafasi Makelo, a representative of Mbuti pygmies, asked the UN Security Council to recognize cannibalism as a crime against humanity and an act of genocide. According to a report by Minority Rights Group International, there is evidence of mass killings, cannibalism, and rape. The report, which labeled these events as a campaign of extermination, linked much of the violence to beliefs about special powers held by the Bambuti. In the Ituri district, rebel forces ran an operation code-named "Effacer le Tableau" (to wipe the slate clean). The aim of the operation, according to witnesses, was to rid the forest of pygmies.

=== Darfur ===
The Darfur genocide is the systematic killing of ethnic Darfuri people by the Al-Bashir regime of the Sudanese government, which has occurred during the War in Darfur and the ongoing War in Sudan (2023–present) in Darfur.

=== Guatemala ===
During the Guatemalan Civil War (1960–1996), state forces carried out violent atrocities against Mayans. The government considered them to be aligned with the communist insurgents. Guatemalan armed forces carried out three campaigns that have been described as genocidal.

The first was a scorched earth policy which was also accompanied by mass killing, including the forced conscription of Mayan boys into the military where they were sometimes forced to participate in massacres against their own home villages. The second was to hunt down and exterminate those who had survived and evaded the army; and the third was the forced relocation of survivors to "reeducation centers" and the continuous pursuit of those who had fled into the mountains.

The armed forces used genocidal rape of women and children as a deliberate tactic. Children were bludgeoned to death by beating them against walls or being thrown alive into mass graves where they would be crushed by the weight of an adult corpse thrown atop them. An estimated 200,000 people, most of them Mayans, disappeared during the Guatemalan Civil War.

After the 1996 peace accords, a legal process to determine the legal responsibility of the atrocities and to locate and identify the disappeared ones began. In 2013, former president Efraín Ríos Montt was convicted of genocide and crimes against humanity. He was sentenced to 80 years of imprisonment but the Constitutional Court of Guatemala overturned his conviction only ten days later.

=== Indonesia ===
From the time of its independence until the late 1960s, the Indonesian government sought control of the western half of the island of New Guinea, which had remained under the control of the Netherlands. When it finally achieved internationally recognized control of the area, several clashes occurred between the Indonesian government and the Free Papua Movement. The government of Indonesia began a series of measures aimed to suppress the organization in the 1970s, which reached high levels in the mid-1980s.

The resulting human rights abuses included extrajudicial killings, torture, disappearances, rape, and harassment of indigenous people throughout the province. A 2004 report by the Allard K. Lowenstein International Human Rights Clinic at Yale Law School identified both the mass violence and the transmigration policies which encouraged mostly Balinese and Javanese families to relocate to the area as strong evidence "that the Indonesian government has committed proscribed acts with the intent to destroy the West Papuans as such, in violation of the 1948 Convention on the Prevention and Punishment of the Crime of Genocide."

Genocide against indigenous people in the region was key to claims made in the U.S. case of Beanal v. Freeport, one of the first lawsuits where indigenous people outside the U.S. petitioned to get a ruling against a multinational corporation for environmental destruction outside of the U.S. While the petitioner, an indigenous leader, claimed that the mining company Freeport-McMoRan had committed genocide through environmental destruction which "resulted in the purposeful, deliberate, contrived and planned demise of a culture of indigenous people", the court found that genocide pertains only to the destruction of an indigenous people and did not apply to the destruction of the culture of indigenous people; however, the court did leave open the opportunity for the petitioners to amend their filings with an additional claim.

=== Myanmar/Burma ===
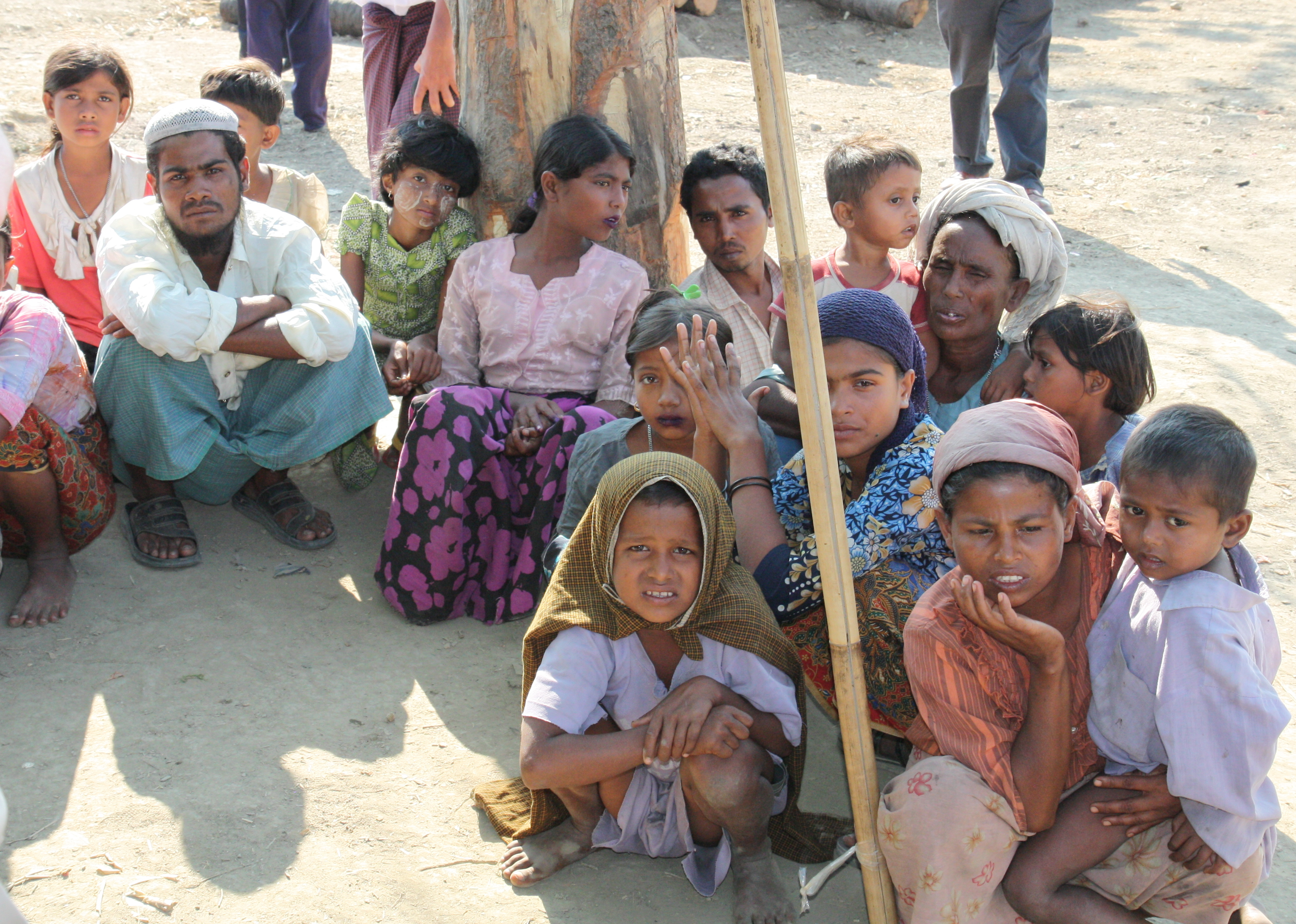
Displaced Rohingya people in Rakhine State

In Myanmar (Burma), the long-running civil war between the Military Junta and the insurgents has resulted in widespread atrocities against the indigenous Karen people, some of whom are allied with the insurgents. These atrocities have been described as genocidal. Burmese General Maung Hla stated that one day the Karen will only exist "in a museum" The government has deployed 50 battalions in the Northern sector systematically attacking Karen villages with mortar and machine gun fire, and landmines. At least 446,000 Karen have been displaced from their homes by the military. The Karen are also reported to have been subjected to forced labor, genocidal rape, child labor, and the conscription of child soldiers. The Rohingya people have also been subjected to persecution mass killings, genocidal mass rapes and forced displacement. The Myanmar army burned their villages and forced them to flee the country. Mass graves which contain the remains of many victims of genocide were discovered. By 2017 over 700,000 Rohingya people fled to Bangladesh, whose government was praised for giving shelter to them.

=== Palestine ===
Throughout the extended Israeli–Palestinian conflict, scholars, human rights organizations, and UN experts have accused the State of Israel of committing genocide against Palestinians. Events such as the 1948 Nakba, the 1982 Sabra and Shatila massacre, the blockade of the Gaza Strip (2007–present), and the 2014 Gaza War have been cited by these groups as evidence of a historic or ongoing genocide.

Following the onset of the Gaza war in 2023, a wide consensus among genocide scholars, legal experts, and international organizations concluded that Israel is committing genocide against Palestinians in Gaza. This recognition has been affirmed by bodies including a United Nations special committee and commission of inquiry, the International Association of Genocide Scholars, and major human rights organizations, alongside ongoing proceedings initiated by South Africa against Israel at the International Court of Justice (South Africa v. Israel), alleging violations of the Genocide Convention.

=== Paraguay ===
In 2002, the numbers of the 17 indigenous nations, who primarily live in the Chaco region of Paraguay, were estimated to be 86,000. Between 1954 and 1989, when the military dictatorship of General Alfredo Stroessner ruled Paraguay, the indigenous population of the country suffered from more loss of territory and human rights abuses than at any other time in the nation's history. In early 1970, international groups claimed that the state was complicit in the genocide of the Aché, the charges being kidnappings, sale of children, withholding medicines and food, slavery, and torture.

During the 1960s and 1970s, 85% of the Aché people were killed, often hacked to death with machetes, in order to make room for the timber industry, mining, farming, and ranchers. According to Jérémie Gilbert, the situation in Paraguay has proven that it is difficult to provide the proof required to show "specific intent", in support of a claim that genocide had occurred. The Aché, whose cultural group is now seen as extinct, fell victim to development by the state which had promoted the exploration of their territories by transnational companies for natural resources. Gilbert concludes that although a planned and voluntary destruction had occurred, it is argued by the state that there was no intent to destroy the Aché, as what had happened was due to development and was not a deliberate action.

=== Peru ===
Between 1996 and 2000, while under the leadership of President Alberto Fujimori, the Peruvian government carried out coercive sterilizations on approximately 300,000 Peruvian women. The state specifically targeted rural, impoverished, and indigenous populations through the use of bribes, threats, and deceitful tactics in order to perform tubal ligations and vasectomies without the individuals' informed consent.

=== Sri Lanka ===
The crackdown on the Sri Lankan Tamils during the 1958 anti-Tamil pogrom and the Sri Lankan Civil War have been described as genocidal in nature by the United Nations. Sri Lankan mobs brutally butchered thousands of Tamil people in 1958, starting a series of genocides over the years that eventually led to a civil war in 1983. Since the end of the civil war in 2009, the Sri Lankan state has been subject to much global criticism for violating human rights by bombing civilian targets, using of heavy weaponry, abducting and killing of Sri Lankan Tamils and using sexual violence.

Human Rights Watch was the first to accuse the Sri Lankan government of genocide under international law in December 2009. Leading American expert in international law Professor Francis A. Boyle held an emergency meeting with U.N. Secretary-General Ban Ki-moon to urge to stop the Tamil genocide by providing evidence of crimes against humanity, genocide against Tamils and the international community's failure to stop the slaughter of Tamil civilians in Sri Lanka. In February 2020, the US State Department and US Secretary of State Mike Pompeo announced that General Shavendra Silva, current commander of the Sri Lankan Army, was banned from entering the United States due to war crimes committed by the 53rd division of the Sri Lankan army, in which he has involved through command responsibility

=== Tigray ===
During the Tigray War, Ethiopia and Eritrea have been accused of committing genocide against the ethnic Tigrayans, native to the northern Tigray Region of Ethiopia.

=== Yazidi genocide in Iraq ===
Yazidis are an indigenous minority group in the Middle East that practices its own monotheistic religion. They have frequently been stigmatized and targeted for violence by Islamist extremists in Iraq (most recently in the genocide by ISIL, and other Islamist groups also perpetrated acts of violence against Yazidis in the past), with multiple studies leading researchers to conclude that acts of genocide have been perpetrated against the Yazidi community in Iraq, including mass killings and rape.

While acts of violence against Yazidis have been documented for centuries, recent acts of violence against them include deadly terrorist attacks such as the 2007 Yazidi communities bombings and the August 2014 Sinjar massacre. Yazidi women and girls have frequently been kept as sex slaves and have been subjected to slave trading by ISIL terrorists during the recent events of the genocide of Yazidis by ISIL. This resulted in the forcible displacement of over 500,000 Yazidis from Iraq. In 2014 alone, 5000 Yazidis were killed, but long before that year, the genocide was already being committed against the Yazidis. It is still going on nowadays. In February 2021, the remains of 104 Yazidis killed by ISIL were found and laid to rest.

== Denialism ==
Denial of genocides of Indigenous peoples, a form of genocide denial, consists of claims in which the multiple genocides and atrocity crimes which have been committed against Indigenous peoples are denied. The denialism claims contradict the academic consensus, which acknowledges the fact that genocides were committed. The claim is a form of denialism, genocide denial, historical negationism and historical revisionism. The atrocity crimes include genocide, crimes against humanity, war crimes, and ethnic cleansing.

== See also ==
- Apologies to Indigenous peoples
- Genocide studies
- Index of racism-related articles
- Indigenous response to colonialism
- List of ethnic cleansing campaigns
- List of genocides
- Outline of genocide studies
