= Scientific Reports =

- Discipline: Natural sciences
- Language: English
- Edited by: Rafal Marszalek

Publication details
- History: 2011–present
- Publisher: Nature Portfolio
- Frequency: Continuous
- Open access: Yes
- License: Creative Commons Attribution
- Impact factor: 4.9 (2025)

Standard abbreviations
- ISO 4: Sci. Rep.

Indexing
- CODEN: SRCEC3
- ISSN: 2045-2322
- LCCN: 2011250880
- OCLC no.: 732869387

Links
- Journal homepage

Scientific Reports is a peer-reviewed open-access scientific mega journal published by Nature Portfolio, covering all areas of the natural sciences. The journal was established in 2011. Their aim is to assess solely the scientific validity of a submitted paper, rather than its perceived importance, significance, or impact.

In September 2016, the journal became the largest in the world by number of articles, overtaking PLOS One.

In 2026 PubMed stopped indexing further papers published by Scientific Reports, pending further review by the US National Library of Medicine.

== Abstracting and indexing ==
The journal is abstracted and indexed in the Chemical Abstracts Service, the Science Citation Index Expanded, and selectively in Index Medicus/MEDLINE/PubMed. In October 2026, Tom Lahey, a self-described “independent, self-funded researcher", discovered that for two months Scientific Reports articles have not been indexed by MEDLINE. The editor-in-chief Rafal Marszalek confirmed on 20 October that the journal is being reviewed by the US National Library of Medicine, and the indexing and archiving (in PubMed Central) of all new articles is on hold.

According to the Journal Citation Reports, the journal has a 2025 impact factor 4.9.

== Reviewing policy ==
The Guide to Referees states that to be published, "a paper must be scientifically valid and technically sound in methodology and analysis", and reviewers have to ensure manuscripts "are not assessed based on their perceived importance, significance or impact", but this procedure has been questioned.

== Controversies ==
=== Controversial articles ===
==== 2016 ====
Allegedly duplicated and manipulated images in a 2016 paper that were not detected during peer review led to criticism from the scientific community. The article was retracted in June 2016.

==== 2018 ====
In 2018, Scientific Reports appeared on a blacklist from the Zhongshan Ophthalmic Center at Sun Yat-sen University in Guangzhou, amid moves by the Chinese government to create national blacklists for journals.

The face of Donald Trump was hidden in an image of baboon feces in a paper published in 2018. The journal later removed the image.

==== 2019 ====
A 2018 paper claimed that a homeopathic treatment could attenuate pain in rats. It was retracted 8 months later after "swift criticism" from the scientific community.

A controversial 2018 paper suggested that too much bent-neck staring at a cell phone could grow a "horn" on the back of someone's head. The study also failed to mention the conflict of interests of the first author. The paper was later corrected.

==== 2020 ====
A 2016 study proclaimed that a human papillomavirus (HPV) vaccine caused impaired mobility and brain damage in mice. The paper alarmed public health advocates in Japan and worldwide because of the potential side effects of the HPV vaccine on humans. The study was retracted two years later because "the experimental approach does not support the objectives of the study".

It took Scientific Reports more than four years to retract a plagiarized study from a bachelor's thesis of a Hungarian mathematician. The paper, entitled "Modified box dimension and average weighted receiving time on the weighted fractal networks", was published in December 2015, and the plagiarism was reported in January 2016 by the former bachelor student. In April 2020, the paper was retracted.

A study published in the journal on June 24, 2019, claimed that fluctuations in the sun were causing global warming. Based on severe criticism from the scientific community, Scientific Reports started an investigation on the validity of this study, and it was retracted by the editors in March 2020.

==== 2021 ====
Scientific Reports retracted a 2019 paper in January 2021 which claimed that "both Creationism and Big Bang theory are wrong, and that black holes are the engines driving the universe".

A paper published in July 2020, which said body weight can be correlated with being honest or dishonest, caused consternation among social media users, questioning why Scientific Reports agreed to publish this paper. The paper was eventually retracted in January 2021.

A paper published in September 2021 implied that the Biblical story of the destruction of Sodom and Gomorrah might have been a retelling of an exploding asteroid around the year 1,650 BCE. The paper received criticism on social media and by data sleuths for using a doctored image. On February 15, 2023, the following editor's note was posted on this paper, "Readers are alerted that concerns raised about the data presented and the conclusions of this article are being considered by the Editors. A further editorial response will follow the resolution of these issues." Allen West, the corresponding author, was listed as a member of the journal's editorial board shortly before the paper was published. In 2025 the paper was retracted.

=== Resignations of editorial board members ===
In 2015, editor Mark Maslin resigned because the journal introduced a trial of a fast-track peer-review service for biology manuscripts in exchange for an additional fee. The trial ran for a month.

In November 2017, 19 editorial board members stepped down due to the journal not retracting a plagiarised 2016 study. The article was eventually retracted in March 2018.

== See also ==
- Nature Communications
- Cell Reports
