= Russell Thornton =

Cherokee-American anthropologist (born 20 February 1942)

- Born: February 20, 1942 (age 84)

Academic background
- Education: Florida State University; Harvard University; University of Southern California

Academic work
- Discipline: anthropology
- Institutions: University of California at Los Angeles
- Main interests: population history of the Indigenous peoples of the Americas

Russell Thornton (born 20 February 1942) is a Cherokee-American anthropologist and professor of anthropology at the University of California at Los Angeles, who is known for his studies of the population history of the Indigenous peoples of the Americas.

== Publications ==
- 1986 We Shall Live Again: The 1870 and 1890 Ghost Dance Movements as Demographic Revitalization (Cambridge University Press).
- 1987 American Indian Holocaust and Survival (University of Oklahoma Press).
- 1990 The Cherokees: A Population History (University of Nebraska Press).
- 1998 Editor. Studying Native America: Problems and Prospects (University of Wisconsin Press).
- 2007 Co-editor with Candace S. Greene. The Year the Stars Fell: Lakota Winter Counts at the Smithsonian (University of Nebraska Press and the Smithsonian Institution).

== Awards & grants ==
- College of Social Sciences Sesquicentennial Lecture, The Florida State University, 2001
- Distinguished Professorship, UCLA, 2004–present
- The Hail Lecture (with Candace Greene), Brown University, 2007

== Education ==
- Ph.D., Sociology, Florida State University (1968)
- Postdoctoral (Social Relations), Harvard University (1968–1969)
- Postdoctoral (Demography), University of Southern California (1980)
