= Mark Maslin =

English professor (born 1968)

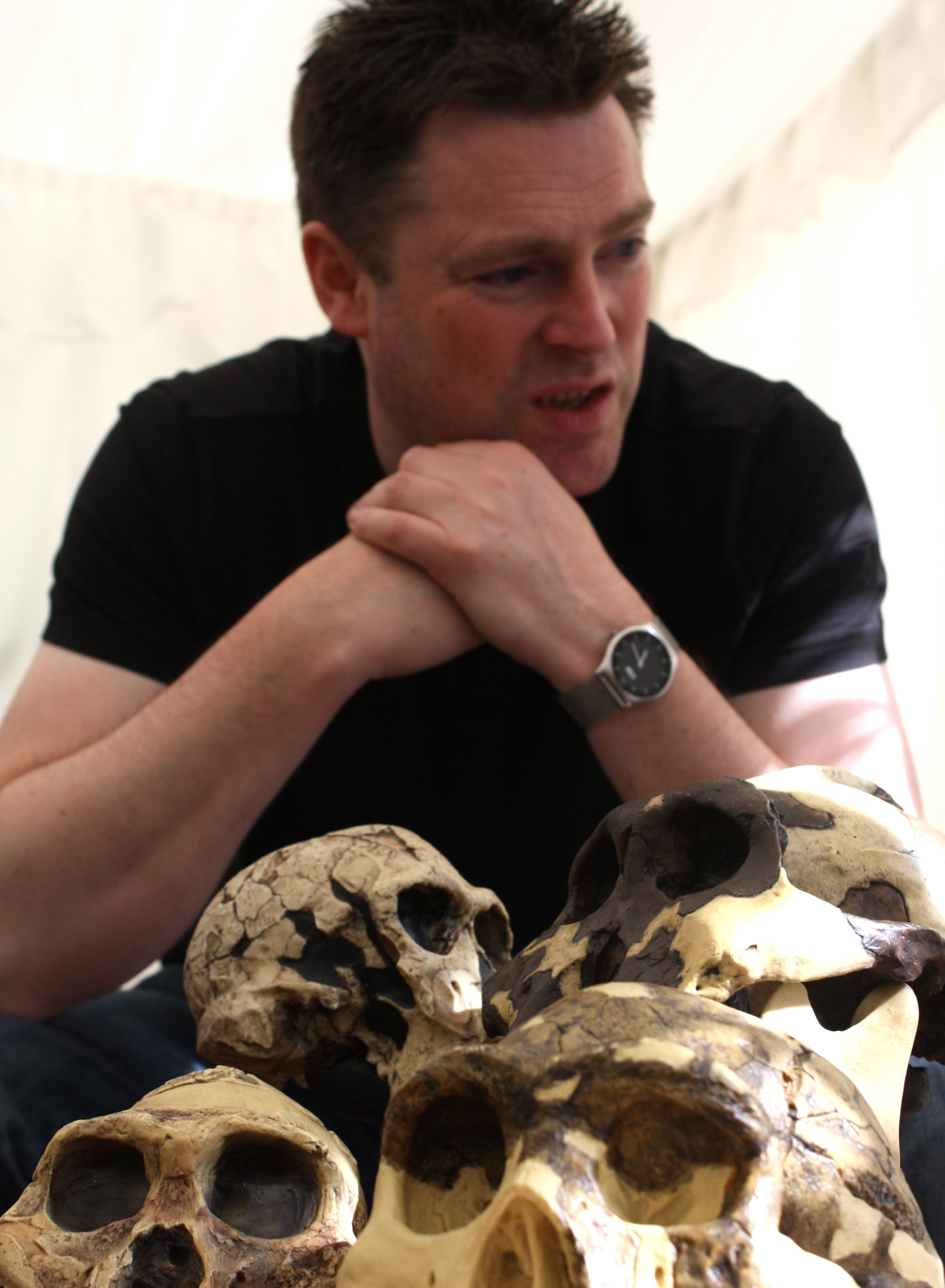
Mark Maslin at the Cheltenham Science Festival

Mark Andrew Maslin (born 1968) is a professor of Earth System Science at University College London and Lead for Climate, Health and Security at the United Nations University. He has published numerous books on a variety of environmental topics including climate change, ecology, the anthropocene and human evolution. His scientific work consists of more than 230 publications. He is joint Pro-Vice-Provost of the UCL Climate Crisis Grand Challenge. He is also Strategy Advisor to Lansons, Net Zero Now, Sheep Inc and was a CSR Board member of Sopra Steria. He co-founded and helped to run the AI geoanalytics company Rezatec Ltd from 2012 to 2023. He is also a founding member of the Climate Crisis Advisory Group led by Sir David King. In 2024 he was Special Advisor to the UK Parliament Environmental Audit Committee inquiry into Climate Change and Security. He is also a member of the Nuffield Council on Bioethics working group on Solar Radiation Modification.

== Education ==
Maslin was born in 1968. He received his BSc (Hons) in Physical Geography (including Geology and Chemistry at honours level) from the University of Bristol in 1989. A few years later, in 1993 he attained his PhD for "The study of the palaeoceanography of the N.E. Atlantic during Pleistocene" from the Darwin College, University of Cambridge, having Nicholas Shackleton and Ellen Thomas as his supervisors.

== Scientific work ==
Maslin has published over 230 scientific papers, some of them in journals such as Nature, having received approximately 36,000 citations according to ResearchGate and more than 44,700 according to Google Scholar, where his h-index is given to be 82 and an i10 index of 214.

Maslin teaches undergraduate and postgraduate courses at the University College London and has supervised many PhD and MSc dissertations.

From 2014 to 2019, he was Director of The London NERC Doctoral Training Partnership. He was also the co-founder of Rezatec Ltd. In 2024 he set up the UCL Institute for Sustainable Aviation and Aerospace to provide expert advice and support to help the aviation sector decarbonise now.

=== Notable views ===
==== The Great Dying of the Indigenous Peoples of America ====
The Spanish and Portuguese colonisation of the Americas led to the death of 56 million people, approximately 90% of the indigenous population, in less than 100 years. This was because the indigenous population had no natural immunity to the diseases brought across the Atlantic Ocean. The population collapse led to the collapse of most of the agriculture and infrastructure. According to research by Alex Koch, Chris Brierley, Mark Maslin and Simon Lewis, the global temperature decreased between 1550 and 1700 as forest regeneration resulted in additional carbon sequestration. Describing this decrease in atmospheric carbon dioxide as the orbis spike, Maslin and Lewis state that the event could be viewed as the beginning of the Anthropocene.

==== Early Human Evolution ====
Mark Maslin’s research has radically altered our views on the causes of early human evolution in Africa particularly with regards to speciation, brain expansion and dispersal events. By creating and compiling palaeoclimate and hominin records he has proposed the ‘Pulsed Climate Variability’ hypothesis. Maslin and colleagues have shown that the slow drying out of the East African climate over the last 5 million years was punctuated by episodes of short, alternating periods of extreme wetness and aridity. These periods of extreme climate variability are characterised by the precessionally forced rapid appearance and disappearance of large, deep fresh-water lakes in the East African Rift Valley. These ephemeral lakes are only possible due to the dynamic tectonics of the region, which has produced so called Amplifier Lake basins. The ’Pulsed Climate Variability’ hypothesis overturned the over-simplified ‘aridity hypothesis’, which had been the theory for human evolution for the last 20 years changing the paradigm and fundamentally altering our views of what caused human evolution in Africa.

=== Science communication ===
In the context of science communication, he has appeared on such shows as Melvyn Bragg's In Our Time and David Attenborough's Climate Change – The Facts, at Talks at Google, on BBC's Newshour, on Channel 4's Dispatches on BBC World service The Climate Question and BBC 4 The Briefing Room. Furthermore, he has written numerous books on environmental matters and has authored articles on for The Conversation, The Guardian, The New York Times and other media.

== Books ==
- Mark Maslin (2021), How to Save Our Planet: The Facts, Penguin Life, ISBN 9780241472521
- Mark Maslin (2021), Climate Change, A Very Short Introduction, 4th Edition, Oxford University Press, ISBN 9780198867869
- Simon Lewis and Mark Maslin (2018), The Human Planet, Pelican Press, ISBN 0241280885, 978-0241280881
- Mark Maslin (2017), The Cradle of Humanity, Oxford University Press, ISBN 9780198704522
- Mark Maslin (2014), Climate Change, A Very Short Introduction, 3rd Edition, Oxford University Press
- Mark Maslin (2013), Climate, A Very Short Introduction, Oxford University Press
- Mark Maslin (2008), Global Warming, A Very Short Introduction: 2nd Edition, Oxford University Press
- Mark Maslin (2004), Global Warming, A Very Short Introduction, Oxford University Press
- Mark Maslin (2003), Etat d'urgence: Le ciel en colère, Solar ISBN 2263036229, 978-2263036224
- Mark Maslin (2002), Stormy Weather, Apple Press, ISBN 1-84092-378-4
- Mark Maslin (2002), The Coming Storm, Barron's Educational Series, ISBN 0-7641-2219-3
- Mark Maslin (2002), Global Warming, Colin Baxter Photography, UK, ISBN 1-84107-120-X
- Mark Maslin (2002), Global Warming: Causes, Effects and the Future, Voyageur Press, USA, ISBN 0760329656, 9780760329658
- Mark Maslin (2000), Earthquakes (a volume for 8-12 year olds), Wayland, Hove, UK. Hardback (ISBN 0 7502 2472 X) (1999), Paperback (ISBN 0-7502-2738-9)
- Mark Maslin (2000), Storms (a volume for 8-12 year olds), Wayland, Hove, UK. Hardback (ISBN 0 7502 2474 6) (1999), Paperback (ISBN 0-7502-2740-0)
- Emma Durham and Mark Maslin (2000), Floods, Wayland, Hove, UK. Hardback (ISBN 0 7502 2473 8) (1999), Paperback (ISBN 0-7502-2739-7)
