= V (Finnish magazine) =

Finnish magazine

V was a Finnish monthly free-of-charge magazine. The magazine was published by the Finnish publisher Sanoma and was distributed at 320 places in the Helsinki capital region, Tampere and Turku. Distribution included 85 thousand copies in the capital region as well as 20 thousand each in Tampere and in Turku.

The magazine launched in 2006 aimed at the young adult generation of 20- to 30-year-olds. The magazine was based on the Nöjesguiden magazine published by Medianorth Group. Sanoma bought the magazine from Medianorth Group in 2005 and changed its name to V. Its content was mostly similar to other similar magazines such as City, Nöjesguiden and Metropoli. The first issue was published in spring 2006.

Because of low popularity, V was discontinued in late May 2007 as a separate magazine and incorporated into Metro.

== Additional information ==
Sanoma Kaupunkilehdet fired the magazine's editor Saila-Mari Kohtala in March 2007 because of an article in the V magazine about use of drugs. The editor-in-chief Janne Kaijärvi thought the article presented drugs in a positive light and ordered the entire print run of the issue to be withdrawn from circulation. The article was replaced with another article, after which the issue was published again.
