= Robin Hood (2018 soundtrack) =

Robin Hood (Original Motion Picture Soundtrack)

Film score by Joseph Trapanese
- Released: November 16, 2018
- Recorded: 2018
- Studios: AIR Studios, London; Remote Control Productions, Santa Monica, California
- Genre: Film score
- Length: 77:59
- Label: Sony Masterworks
- Producer: Joseph Trapanese

Joseph Trapanese chronology
Unsolved (2017)	Robin Hood (2018)	Myth: A Frozen Tale (2019)

Robin Hood (Original Motion Picture Soundtrack) is the film score to the 2018 film Robin Hood directed by Otto Bathurst and starring Taron Egerton, Jamie Foxx, Ben Mendelsohn, Eve Hewson, Tim Minchin and Jamie Dornan. The film score is composed by Joseph Trapanese and released through Sony Masterworks on November 16, 2018.

== Production and recording ==
Joseph Trapanese was announced to compose the film score for Robin Hood and recorded the score at the AIR Studios in London during April 2018. The London Chamber Orchestra performed the score, conducted by Trapanese himself and orchestrated by David Butterworth. The orchestral portions were recorded in an unusual manner. Instead of placing the basses in the center, those basses were split and placed on either sound of the room to bounce of the walls, creating a more low-end and bass-driven sound, and the violins were place far back in the room, to allow the sound to marinate in the room before hitting the microphones, allowing high strings coming after the low-end sound. The brass section, which consisted of 12 horns, two tubas, six trombones and four trumpets were recorded separately.

== Release ==
The soundtrack album was released through Sony Masterworks on November 16, 2018, five days ahead of the film's release.

== Reception ==
Zanobard Reviews gave 7/10 to the score and wrote: "Joseph Trapanese's score to Robin Hood is a bit of an oddball, being part generic superhero and part 2013's Oblivion (yes, seriously). That doesn't stop it however from being an upbeat, epic and pretty enjoyable soundtrack overall." Adam Lubitow of City called it "a pounding score that desperately wants to remind you of Hans Zimmer in The Dark Knight mode". Owen Gleiberman of Variety and Todd McCarthy of The Hollywood Reporter called the score "bombastic" and "thrilling".

Emmet Asher-Perrin of Reactor wrote: "the soundtrack by Joseph Trapanese could be copy-pasted onto any current Marvel film and do just fine. Maybe he was trying to audition for them with this score? I'd buy anything at this point." Chris Bumbray of JoBlo.com wrote: "Joseph Trapanese's score [is] dangerously close to becoming a generic sound-alike at times (a bummer – Trapanese is a terrific composer who could have done better had he been given the opportunity)." Bill Bria of /Film called it "a propulsive score by Joseph Trapanese".

== Track listing ==
No.	Title	Length
1.	"Loxley Manor"	4:59
2.	"Syria"	7:05
3.	"Marion Looks for Rob"	1:43
4.	"He's My Son"	3:12
5.	"Return to England"	3:09
6.	"Rob Inspired"	3:55
7.	"Nottingham"	4:25
8.	"Sheriff Intro"	0:43
9.	"Follow the Money"	1:01
10.	"Becoming a Thief"	3:19
11.	"First Heists"	1:54
12.	"Becoming a Hero"	3:45
13.	"Money to the People"	2:26
14.	"Rob Goes Big"	2:54
15.	"The Treasury"	2:30
16.	"Becoming the Hood"	1:30
17.	"Attacking the Slags"	4:18
18.	"Horse Chase"	4:43
19.	"Sacrifice"	1:09
20.	"Rob Inspires the People"	4:05
21.	"Here's the Plan"	2:30
22.	"Devil's Work Undone"	4:25
23.	"City Siege"	2:22
24.	"Escape to Sherwood"	3:36
25.	"Viktor (Bonus Track)"	2:21
Total length:		77:59

== Personnel ==
Credits adapted from liner notes:

- Music composer – Joseph Trapanese
- Music producer – Bryan Lawson, Joseph Trapanese
- Additional music and arrangements – Clark Rhee, Hal Rosenfeld, Jared Fry, Jason Lazarus
- Recording – Jake Jackson
- Additional recording – Noah Scot Snyder
- Recordist – Laurence Anslow
- Mixing – Alan Meyerson
- Mastering – Patricia Sullivan
- Supervising music editor – Bryan Lawson
- Music editor – Dominick Certo
- Score editor – David Channing
- Music supervisor – Randall Poster
- Music consultant – Celeste Chada
- Musical assistance – Alex Ferguson, Alex Kish, Ashley Andrew Jones, Colleen Lutz, Dylan Shyka, Erik Lutz, Eva Reistad, Max Davidoff-Grey, Pietro Milanesi
- Technical score coordinator – Clark Rhee
- Music librarian – Jill Streater
- Copyist – BTW Productions, Booker White
- Graphic design – WLP Ltd

Management

- Film music coordinator (Summit Entertainment) – Hannah Harris
- Music business affairs (Summit Entertainment) – Heather Rajcic
- Soundtrack acquisitions (Masterworks) – Mark Cavell
- Director of film and television music (Summit Entertainment) – Ryan Svendsen, Lilly Reid
- Executive in charge of film music (Summit Entertainment) – Amy Dunning
- General manager and executive vice president of music business affairs (Summit Entertainment) – Lenny Wohl
- Music finance executive (Summit Entertainment) – Chris Brown
- Vice president of music business affairs (Summit Entertainment) – Raha Johartchi
- Product development manager (Masterworks) – Jennifer Liebeskind

Orchestra

- Supervising orchestrator – Jennifer Hammond
- Orchestrator – David Butterworth
- Orchestra leader – Everton Nelson
- Conductor – Joseph Trapanese
- Contractor – Isobel Griffiths
- Assistant contractor – Susie Gillis
