= Jesús G. Maestro =

Spanish literary theorist (born 1967)

- Born: Jesús González Maestro; 1 December 1967 (age 58); Gijón, Spanish State
- Citizenship: Spain
- Known for: Contribution to literary theory

Academic background
- Education: University of Oviedo
- Thesis: La expresión dialógica en el discurso lírico: (la poesía de Miguel de Unamuno) (1993)
- Doctoral advisor: María del Carmen Bobes Naves
- Influences: Gustavo Bueno; Miguel de Cervantes

Academic work
- Discipline: Comparative literature, Philology
- Institutions: University of Vigo
- Notable works: Critique of Literary Reason

Jesús González Maestro (Gijón, 1 December 1967) is a Spanish literary critic and theorist, scholar, and professor.

He developed a scientific theory of literature rooted in the Hispanic-Greco-Latin literary tradition, from which he reinterpreted earlier literary theories in a distinctive and original way, from Plato and Aristotle to Bueno’s philosophical materialism. His approach is particularly Baroque in its complexity, anti-Enlightenment, and anti-idealist. He does not subscribe to any system of thought external to his own theoretical framework. As he puts it: “I speak on behalf of no ideology, no philosophy, and no religion: I speak on behalf of the literary knowledge at my disposal. Literature is a struggle for freedom against the enemies of reason."

== Early life and education ==
He studied at the University of Oviedo between 1985 and 1990, defending his thesis in 1993. The next year, he became professor of comparative literature at the University of Vigo, where he developed academic work related to literary semiotics. His reflections on literature are presented in his 2017 book Crítica de la Razón Literaria.

== Academic career ==
Maestro traces the origins of modern literature to Cervantes's Don Quixote, and argues that literature, as a form of art, is essentially a ''rational construct''.

He publishes divulgative videos about literature in general on YouTube, and became an internet phaenomenon, although he refuses being called a "YouTuber".

== Notable works ==
- La expresión dialógica en el discurso lírico: la poesía de Miguel de Unamuno, pragmática y transducción (Thesis). Reichenberger. 1994.
- La escena imaginaria: poética del teatro de Miguel de Cervantes. Iberoamericana Editorial Vervuert. 2000.
- La secularización de la tragedia. Cervantes y "La Numancia". Ediciones del Orto. 2004.
- Crítica de los géneros literarios en el Quijote. Idea y concepto de «Género» en la investigación literaria. Editorial Academia del Hispanismo. 2009.
- El concepto de ficción en la literatura. Editorial Academia del Hispanismo. 2014.
- El mito de la interpretación literaria. Editorial Academia del Hispanismo. 2014.
- El origen de la literatura. Anthropos Editorial. 2017.
- Crítica de la razón literaria. El materialismo filosófico como teoría, crítica y dialéctica de la literatura. Vigo: Editorial Academia del Hispanismo. 2017. ISBN 978-84-16187-45-4.
- Crítica de la razón literaria. Una Teoría de la Literatura científica, crítica y dialéctica. Madrid, Cátedra Hispánica de Estudios Literarios. 2025, segunda edición (25 tomos). ISBN 979-83-091-325-15.
- Hacia una interpretación de la literatura a través de las ciencias desde la "Crítica de la razón literaria. Editorial Academia del Hispanismo. 2020.
- Anatomía del Quijote, Cátedra Hispánica de Estudios Literarios. 2025. ISBN 979-83-067-023-60.
- Una filosofía para sobrevivir en el siglo XXI. Madrid: HarperCollins Ibérica. 2026. ISBN 978-84-106-419-14.
- El fracaso de la felicidad. Madrid: HarperCollins Ibérica. 2026. ISBN 978-84-106-449-22.
