= Élise Huillery =

French economist

- Scientific career
- Fields: Development economics, Education economics, History of economic thought
- Thesis: Histoire coloniale, développement et inégalités dans l'ancienne Afrique occidentale française (2008)
- Doctoral advisor: Denis Cogneau, Thomas Piketty
- Website: https://sites.google.com/site/elisehuillery/home

Élise Huillery is a French economist. She is a member of the Council of Economic Analysis.

She studied at Paris-Sorbonne University and HEC Paris, and the Paris School of Economics. She teaches economics at the University of Paris-Dauphine, and Sciences Po. She works in several economic fields: development economics, the economics of education, and the history of economics. Her PhD thesis worked on the economic analysis of French colonialism. She is a member of Abdul Latif Jameel Poverty Action Lab.

== Works ==
- Huillery, E.; Cogneau, D.; Piketty, T. (2014). Histoire coloniale: développement et inégalités dans l'ancienne Afrique occidentale française (in French). Atelier national de reproduction des thèses.
