= Critique of Literary Reason =

2017 work about a theory of the literature by Jesus G. Maestro

Crítica de la razón literaria: El Materialismo Filosófico como Teoría, Crítica y Dialéctica de la Literatura
- First edition
- Author: Jesús G. Maestro
- Subject: Literary theory
- Publication date: 2017
- ISBN: 978-84-16187-45-4

The Critique of literary reason (Spanish:Crítica de la razón literaria) is a 2017 book by Jesús G. Maestro, in which he develops a scientific literary theory grounded on philosophical materialism.

Maestro defines literature as a "rational human construct" and considers literary theory as a science upon which literary critique must be based.
