= Radhika Desai =

Canadian political scientist (born 1963)

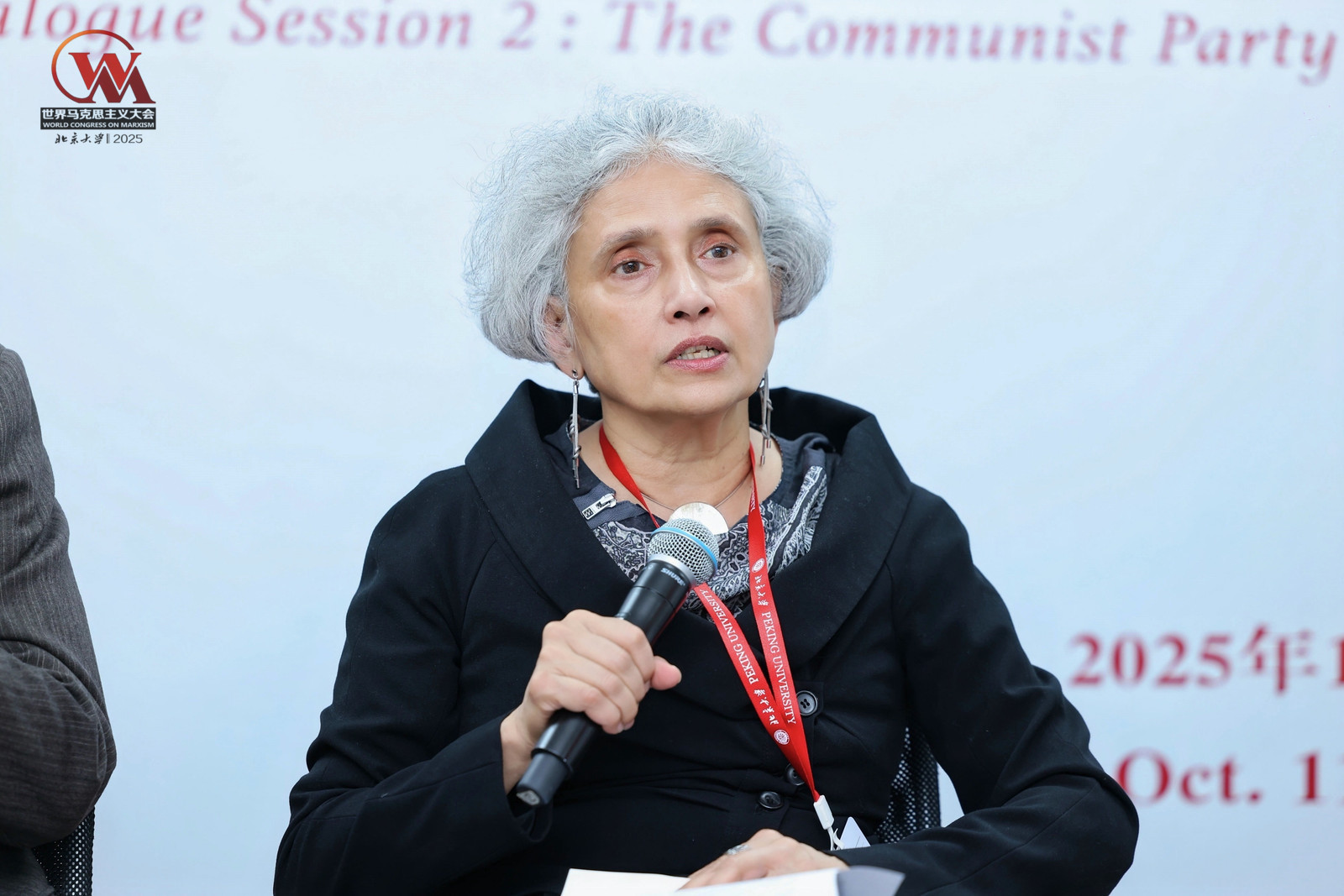
- Radhika Desai during the Fourth World Congress on Marxism, Peking University, Beijing, October 2025
- Citizenship: Canadian

Academic background
- Education: Maharaja Sayajirao University of Baroda; Queen's University at Kingston
- Thesis: Intellectuals and Socialism: "Social Democrats" and the British Labour Party (1991)
- Doctoral advisor: Colin Leys
- Influences: Karl Marx, Friedrich Engels, John Maynard Keynes, Karl Polanyi, Developmental state, Indian communism

Academic work
- Discipline: Comparative Politics, Political economy, British politics and political economy, Indian politics and political economy, International Political Economy, Geopolitical economy, US and UK ‘hegemonies’, Development Studies, Marxism
- Institutions: University of Manitoba, Canada; University of Victoria, Canada
- Website: www.radhikadesai.com

Radhika Desai (born 1963) is a Canadian political scientist of Indian origin, who is currently serving as a professor at the University of Manitoba in Canada., and is also the director of the Geopolitical Economy Research Group. She is the Convenor of the International Manifesto Group.

Desai is best known for her book Geopolitical Economy: After US Hegemony, Globalization and Empire, in which she puts forward the concept of geopolitical economy, an historical materialist approach to the understanding of the international relations of the age of capital, which Karl Marx called ‘the relations of producing nations’.

== Biography ==
After successfully completing her bachelor's degree in political science at Maharaja Sayajirao University of Baroda in India, Desai continued her academic education at Queen's University in Canada, where she completed her master's degree in 1986 (with a thesis on Second-hand Dealers in Ideas: A Study of Think-tanks in a Struggle for Hegemony) and received her Ph.D. in 1992. From 1992 to 2006, she taught at the University of Victoria, and since 2006 she has been at the University of Manitoba. In 2000, she was a visiting professor at Bangalore University in India, in 2008 she was a research fellow at the Center for Modern Oriental Studies in Berlin, in 2009 she was a visiting scholar at the Development Studies Institute (DESTIN) at London School of Economics and Political Science and, since 2024, she has been Visiting Professor at the Department of International Development at the London School of Economics.

Radhika Desai has served as the treasurer (2014–2016) and then president (2016-2020) of the Society for Socialist Studies.

== Positions ==
In her 2013 book, Geopolitical Economy: After US Hegemony, Globalization and Empire she proposed geopolitical economy as a new and more accurate approach to the understanding of the international relations of the world of capitalism, drawing chiefly on the Marxist and other compatible traditions. In doing so, she was also quite critical of 'Marxist economics' and 'Western Marxism' which tend not to understand the necessary relation between capitalism and imperialism theoretically. In place of these, she returns to Karl Marx and Friedrich Engels's original understanding of capitalism as contradictory value production. The contradictions of capitalism require an interventionist state, both to develop capitalism and to stabilize it on an ongoing basis, whether through domestic or international actions, the latter amounting to imperialism.

Desai is also associated with distinctive positions in other fields. In her work Capitalism, Coronavirus and War: A Geopolitical Economy, she argues that the covid pandemic would not only show the injustices accumulated over decades of neoliberalism in capitalist societies but also test these societies’ structures and their coping mechanisms severely. In the same book, she identifies a new form of neoliberalism, which she calls “pseudo-civic neoliberalism.” In this form, capitalist competition and consumer purchasing decisions are replaced by the state as the main buyer, which purchases overpriced patented products from monopolies and distributes them to consumers seemingly free of charge, but financed by taxes. Examples include medical devices and vaccines. This takes the intertwining of capital and the state to a new level, with organizations such as the Bill & Melinda Gates Foundation effectively gaining state power.

In her work on India, she has proposed a new way of understanding the transition from Congress to Hindutva in Indian politics through a multilayered analysis, founded on the political limitations of the post-Independence Nehruvian project. They led to the progressive marketization of economic policy since the late 1960s, including in agriculture. The social result was the expansion of the capitalist class. In party politics, it has led to a decline of Congress, the rise of parties of the provincial propertied classes and the electoral success of the party of Hindutva. Desai has demonstrated the viability of this framework in the case of the 2004, 2009, 2014 and the 2024 general elections.

== Selected publications ==
=== Books authored ===
- Intellectuals and Socialism: 'Social Democrats' and the British Labour Party, London: Lawrence and Wishart, 1994 (New Statesman and Society's Book-of-the-Month)
- Slouching Towards Ayodhya: From Congress to Hindutva in Indian Politics (2nd rev. ed.). New Delhi: Three Essays, 2004
- Geopolitical Economy: After US Hegemony, Globalization and Empire (Future of World Capitalism series). London: Pluto Press, 2013
- International Economic Governance in a Multipolar World. London: Routledge, 2022
- (with Sergey Bodrunov and Alan Freeman) Beyond the Global Crisis: Noonomy, Creativity, Geopolitical Economy. St. Petersburg: S.Y. Witte Institute for New Industrial Development, 2022
- Coronavirus and Capitalism: A Geopolitical Economy, London: Routledge, 2023

=== Books edited ===
- Developmental and Cultural Nationalisms. London: Routledge, 2009 (reprint of a special issue of the Third World Quarterly, vol. 29, no. 3, 2008)
- (with Paul Zarembka) Revitalizing Marxist Theory for Today's Capitalism. New York: Emerald, 2011
- Theoretical Engagements in Geopolitical Economy (Research in Political Economy, 30A). Bingley: Emerald, 2015
- Analytical Gains in Geopolitical Economy (Research in Political Economy, 30B). Bingley: Emerald, 2016
- (with Boris Kagarlitsky and Alan Freeman) Russia, Ukraine and Contemporary Imperialism. London: Routledge, 2017 (reprint of a special issue of International Critical Thought, vol. 6, no. 4, December 2016)
- (with Kari Polanyi Levitt) The Enduring Legacy of Karl Polanyi, Geopolitical Economy series. Manchester: Manchester University Press, 2020
- (with Henry Heller) Revolutions. London: Routledge, 2021
- (with Makoto Itoh and Nobuharu Yokokawa) Japan's Secular Stagnation and Beyond. London: Routledge, 2023
