= Political modernization =

Process of transformation of political laws and life

- Synonym: political modernisation
- Meaning: the process of transformation from a pre-modern 'traditional' polity to a post-traditional 'modern polity'

Political modernization
- Traditional Chinese: 政治現代化
- Simplified Chinese: 政治现代化
- Literal meaning: transformation processes in the political sphere of a society
Transcriptions
Standard Mandarin
- Hanyu Pinyin: Zhèngzhì xiàndàihuà

Political modernization (also spelled as political modernisation; Chinese: 政治現代化), refers to the process of development and evolution from a lower to a higher level, in which a country's constitutional system and political life moves from the superstition of authority, autocracy and the rule of man to rationality, autonomy, democracy and the rule of law. It manifests itself in certain types of political change, like political integration, political differentiation, political secularisation, and so forth. The process of political modernisation has enhanced the capacity of a society's political system, i.e. the effectiveness and efficiency of its performance.

Sustainability studies researcher George Francis argues that 'political modernisation' is the change in the nation-state brought about by the neoliberal globalisation process since the 1970s. It primarily consists of processes of differentiation of political structure and the secularisation of political culture.

According to Samuel Huntington, an American political scientist, political modernization consists of three basic elements, the rationalization of authority, the differentiation of structure and the expansion of political participation.
