= Metropoli =

Finnish Magazine

Metropoli is a Finnish free-of-charge magazine aimed for young adults, available in various cities in Finland.

Compared to the more famous Finnish young adult magazine, City, Metropoli is fairly new and does not have as diverse content. It also only appears once per month, which is less often than City. In contrast, Metropoli is available in more cities. While City covers all aspects of young adult life, Metropoli mainly concentrates on partying.

Metropoli started in Lappeenranta in the early 2000s. Since then, it has expanded elsewhere in Finland, covering almost all of Finland in summer 2004. In spring 2005 it spread to Turku and Pori, and in December 2005 finally to Helsinki, Finland's largest city. Currently the only major city not to have the magazine is Kajaani.

== List of cities ==
Cities where Metropoli is available are Helsinki, Imatra, Joensuu, Jyväskylä, Kemi, Kokkola, Kotka, Kouvola, Kuopio, Lahti, Lappeenranta, Mikkeli, Oulu, Pori, Porvoo, Rauma, Rovaniemi, Salo, Seinäjoki, Tampere, Tornio, Turku, and Vaasa. It also appears in Ylläs during ski season.
