= Geopolitical economy =

Contemporary political economic theory

Geopolitical economy is a contemporary Marxist approach to understanding the capitalist world historically. It was proposed by Radhika Desai in her Geopolitical Economy: After US Hegemony, Globalization and Empire as a critique of contemporary mainstream theories of International political economy (IPE) and International relations (IR). Geopolitical economy's critique rests on a rejection of orthodox views of the world economy as a seamless whole, united either by markets or by a single leading state, as in free market, free trade "globalization" and "hegemony" theories respectively. Instead, geopolitical economy emphasizes the interplay of political entities, namely, states, in the development of capitalism by going back to classical political economy and to the Marxist theories of imperialism, which geopolitical economy argues should be considered the first theories of international relations.

== Background ==
The terms "geo-political economy" and "geo-politics’ had been used by British geographer Stuart Corbridge in his work relating to human geography in a 1991 article seeking to designate an approach "which builds upon uneven development theory and which affirms, once again, the insistently spatial foundations of capitalist production, exchange, and regulation." Around the same time Edward Luttwak, economist and author of military-strategy books also made use of similar terms to proclaim a shift from "geopolitics" to "geo-economics" as the Cold War ended. Desai's work has operationalized the term geopolitical economy into a full-fledged approach to understanding the international relations of the capitalist world. Her geopolitical economy approach has traced its roots in the works of Marx and Engels and other Marxists, linked that tradition to the developmental state tradition and placed the dialectic of imperialism and anti-imperialism, or what Leon Trotsky called Uneven and combined development, at the centre of the understanding of world affairs.

== Components ==
The three main components of the geopolitical economy analysis are the "materiality of nations" thesis, the argument that capitalism develops in an uneven and combined fashion resulting in the tendency towards multipolarity, and geopolitical economy's skepticism towards theories of globalization and US hegemony.

Geopolitical economy's "materiality of nations" thesis insists on the key role of states in capitalism based on an understanding of capitalism as contradictory value production, and the fact that these contradictions must be managed by social agents (pre-eminently states). Geopolitical economy therefore puts imperialism and anti-imperialism, whose interplay Leon Trotsky dubbed that of the Uneven and Combined Development of capitalism, at the heart of both IR and IPE as the motor that drives the international relations of capitalism. In arguing that states are material agents, geopolitical economy also connects Marxism with the literature on "developmental states", focusing on the central role of states in the economic development of today's first world countries, which geopolitical economy understands as the imperial core of capitalism, and for any other countries, socialist or otherwise, which have advanced development after them. Essentially, geopolitical economy argues that while imperialism seeks to produce and maintain the unevenness of capitalist development (development in capitalism's core and underdevelopment elsewhere), developmental states (or "contender states") are essential to preventing or counteracting imperialism. This tenet of geopolitical economy, the centrality of states throughout capitalism's history, leads geopolitical economy to conclude that ideas such as "globalization", in which no state matters, or those of "US hegemony" or "empire", in which only one does, were never accurate.

The "materiality of nations" also insists that, thanks to its contradictions, and resulting imperialism, capitalism is necessarily characterized not just by a state but by multiple states locked in struggle over uneven and combined development, or what geopolitical economy argues is the same thing, imperialism and anti-imperialism.

In this struggle, geopolitical economy argues that in the dialectic between dominant states’ desire to maintain the unevenness of capitalism, and that of states resisting such domination through capitalist or socialist combined development, the latter has prevailed, in the long run and against great odds. That is why, geopolitical economy argues, ideas about the capitalist world expanding peaceably through markets or through a succession of hegemonies of leading capitalist states – the Italian city states, the Dutch United Provinces, the United Kingdom and the United States – were never accurate. In relation to theories of hegemony, geopolitical economy argues that while British dominance, for a time, was inevitable given the historical priority of Britain's industrial revolution, so were challenges to it. By the late nineteenth centuries, such challenges, from the US, Germany and Japan, to name the most successful, had already created a multipolar world, making US hegemony impossible. Though it sought to emulate the sort of dominance Britain enjoyed in the nineteenth century in the twentieth, not only did the US have to lower its sights, forsaking the acquisition of a formal empire, and settling for making the dollar the world's money, geopolitical economy argues it failed to realise even this diluted ambition. Geopolitical economy articulates how these efforts foundered first on its deficits, as the Triffin dilemma predicted, leading in 1971 to the end of the dollar's gold link, and then repeatedly on the financializations, vast expansions of financial demand for the dollar to counteract downward pressure on the dollar thanks to the still effective Triffin Dilemma, on which it came to depend.

Finally, geopolitical economy argues that "globalization" and "US hegemony/empire" were not theories but ideologies, discourses articulating distinct phases of the US's increasingly desperate pursuit of its formatively vain hegemonic ambition. Globalization was the rhetoric of the Clinton administration designed to encourage flows of foreign capital into the US stock market, and US hegemony/empire, a ruse for the projection of a flailing US power abroad unilaterally.

In proposing these theses, geopolitical economy seeks to make the emergence of multipolarity, which none of the orthodox theories of IR anticipated, comprehensible, and enables an appreciation of the potential in it since it brings the perspective of the Third World and the centrality of developmental concerns to the foreground. It shows that the uneven and combined development of capitalism, the dialectic and contest between imperialism and anti-imperialism, has been the historical motor driving the evolution of the capitalist world and that, since the peak of imperialism in 1914, combined development/anti-imperialism has increasingly prevailed, making for the more than century long trend toward multipolarity.
