= Gustavo Bueno =

Spanish philosopher (1924–2016)

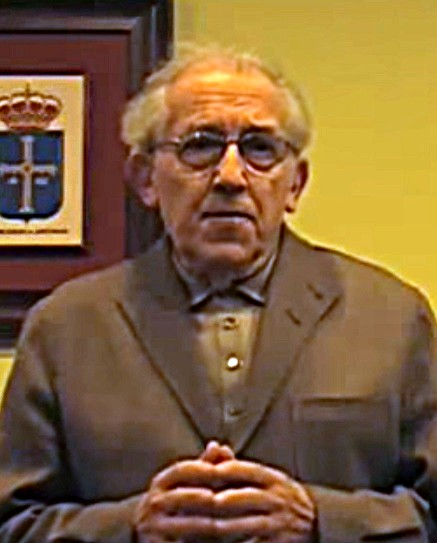
- Gustavo speaking
- Born: Gustavo Bueno Martínez; 1 September 1924; Santo Domingo de la Calzada, Spain
- Died: 7 August 2016 (aged 91); Niembro, Asturias, Spain

Philosophical work
- Era: Contemporary philosophy
- Region: Western philosophy
- School: Continental philosophy; Materialism; Marxism; Rationalism; Scholasticism
- Main interests: Political philosophy; Philosophy of religion; Philosophy of science; Political economy; Mass media
- Notable ideas: Categorial closure, stroma

Gustavo Bueno Martínez (1 September 1924 – 7 August 2016) was a Spanish philosopher and the founder of a philosophical doctrine he named "philosophical materialism".

A student of the national-syndicalist Santiago Montero Díaz, Bueno's philosophical trajectory culminated in a blend of Aristotelian-Thomist scholasticism—influenced by the Catholic School of Salamanca—and Marxism–Leninism during the late years of Francoism.

== Biography ==
Gustavo Bueno Martínez was born in Santo Domingo de la Calzada on 1 September 1924. He was the son of a Germanophile and the grandson of a Carlist. He began studying philosophy at the University of Zaragoza, later earning his licentiate degree and doctoral degree from the University of Madrid. His PhD dissertation, supervised by Santiago Montero Díaz, was titled Fundamento formal y material de la moderna filosofía de la religión ('Formal and material foundation of the modern philosophy of religion'). From 1949 to 1960, he worked as a philosophy teacher (and from 1951 onwards as headmaster) at the 'Lucía Medrano' girls' high school in Salamanca. During the 1950s, he served as the provincial political commissar of the Movimiento. In 1954, he married the prominent SEU activist Carmen Sánchez Revilla. In 1960, he moved to Oviedo, having been appointed Professor of the Fundamentals of Philosophy and History of Philosophical Systems at the University of Oviedo. He died in Niembro (Llanes, Asturias), on 7 August 2016.

== Thought ==
=== Philosophical materialism ===
Bueno labeled the philosophical system around which he developed his thought as "Philosophical Materialism". The systematic philosophical treatment of this doctrine, presented in his 1972 work Ensayos materialistas (Materialist Essays), consists of two parts: the first essay delineates the boundaries of philosophical materialism, while the second expounds the "Doctrine of the three genera of materiality".

Philosophical materialism (Spanish: Materialismo filosófico) is a systematic doctrine regarding the structure of reality, characterized by its opposition both to monistic materialism (typical of dialectical materialism) and to the monistic idealism or spiritualism found in theology. Philosophical materialism is instead a rationalist pluralism; it postulates the uniqueness of the world as the development of a general ontological matter that cannot be reduced to the empirical realm. Rejecting monistic continuity and adhering to the principle of symploké, philosophical materialism denies that "everything influences everything"; simultaneously, it opposes pluralistic atomism by denying that "nothing influences anything else".

Like traditional materialism, philosophical materialism rejects spiritualism and the existence of spiritual essences. However, unlike other forms of materialism, it does not limit itself merely to denying the supernatural. It acknowledges the reality of incorporeal entities: for instance, the real (not merely mental) distance between two water bottles on a table is just as real as the corporeal bottles themselves. This distance constitutes incorporeal, non-spiritual matter. Based on this criterion, the concept of matter is redefined philosophically, leading to the adoption of a more precise term than matter: the stroma.

This system comprises several core areas of study:

- Ontology (general and particular)
- Gnoseology (theory of categorical closure)
- Philosophy of religion (and the role of animals in the essence of religion)

These were the predominant subjects in Bueno's writings until the 1990s. However, at the turn of the millennium, he began to address ethical, social, and political issues. He is widely known in the Hispanophone world for his book España Frente a Europa (Spain Against Europe). In this work, he presents an innovative philosophy of history based on a historical-materialist analysis of the origins of Spain, the Hispanic Empire, and Europe, offering a systematic reconceptualization of several ideas central to Marxism and the broader history of political thought. In this text, he approaches the idea of the nation through a historical study of the term itself, concluding that "the modern Idea of Nation, the political nation, could only appear at a specific historical moment in the modern epoch, namely, during the struggle of the people (stratified into diverse social classes) against the Ancien Régime. It is an Idea of a political Nation that developed in close interaction with other Ideas, namely, the modern Idea of State and the modern Idea of Culture." In this sense, he writes in opposition to "many politicians or historians who 'naively' try to define the 'nation' as if it were a univocal, taxonomic-bureaucratic, technical, or timeless concept, via an ad hoc accumulation of components considered essential or proper—much like the approach found in many political law manuals, or even in Stalin's famous essay Marxism and the National Question." Bueno therefore proceeds to rigorously clarify the distinction between, for instance, a "political nation" and an apolitical "ethnic nation".

=== Spain and empire ===
As a leading intellectual figure for 21st-century defenders of the legacy of the Habsburg Spanish Empire (as opposed to the Bourbon legacy), alongside Elvira Roca Barea, he championed the idea of the Asturian kingdom as an embryonic 'Spain' and as a case of Translatio imperii with respect to Rome. He bypassed the Visigoths, arguing that while they occupied the Iberian Peninsula, they did so "with the intention of remaining isolated within it". Furthermore, he promoted the status of "imperial city" for Oviedo, underpinning his central thesis: the "consubstantiality" between the constitution of 'Spain' as a distinctive entity in Universal History and its conformation as a Universal Empire. He advocated for the political reunification of Hispanic states into a confederation: "The constitution of a Hispanic or Ibero-American Confederation, with a Common Market of around 500 million inhabitants, is, for Professor Bueno, the only alternative available to the American peoples, as well as Spain and Portugal, to free themselves from the Anglo-American Empire."

Bueno’s philosophical analysis of the idea of empire can be summarized by the following quote: "Universal history is supposed to be the history of the human race, according to, say, Hegel and St. Augustine. But this must be subjected to criticism. Universal history is not made by the totality of the human race, but rather by a part of it. Empires constitute that aforementioned part." From this, he concludes that "the Idea of a Universal Empire, endowed with uniqueness, is impossible (not merely improbable), since it would imply the extinction of the State (as the State always presupposes a plurality of States separated by their 'cortical layers'), and with it the ratio imperii of any kind of plans and programs. This means that the Idea of Empire (and herein lies its dialectical contradiction) could never transcend the particular circle of States and can never be extended to the totality of the human race."

== Bibliography ==
- Sciences as Categorical Closures, 2013
- El papel de la Filosofía en el conjunto del saber (1971)
- Ensayos materialistas (1972)
- Ensayo sobre las Categorías de la Economía Política, (1973)
- La Metafísica Presocrática, (1975)
- La Idea de Ciencia desde la Teoría del Cierre Categorial, 1977
- Etnología y utopía, 1982
- Nosotros y ellos, 1983
- El animal divino, 1985
- Cuestiones cuodlibetales sobre Dios y la Religión, (1989)
- Materia, (1990)
- Primer ensayo sobre las categorías de las Ciencias Políticas, (1991)
- Teoría del Cierre Categorial (5 vols.), 1993
- ¿Qué es la filosofía? (1995)
- ¿Qué es la ciencia? (1995)
- El Mito de la Cultura: ensayo de una teoría materialista de la cultura, 1997
- España frente a Europa, 2000
- Telebasura y democracia, 2002
- El mito de la izquierda: las izquierdas y la derecha, 2003
- La vuelta a la caverna: terrorismo, guerra y globalización, 2004
- España no es un mito: claves para una defensa razonada, 2005
- Zapatero y el pensamiento Alicia: un presidente en el país de las maravillas, 2006
- La fe del ateo, 2007
- El Mito de la derecha, 2008
- Ensayo de una definición filosófica de la Idea de Deporte, 2014
- El Ego trascendental, 2016

== Filmography ==
- 2015 – Gustavo Bueno. La vuelta a la caverna (dir. Héctor Muniente) – documentary

== See also ==
- Materialism
- Critique of Literary Reason
