= City (magazine) =

Finnish magazine

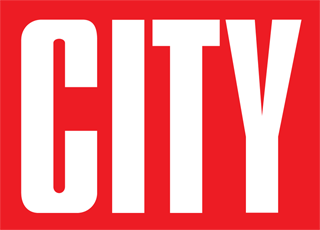
City-lehden logo

City is a Finnish free-of-charge magazine in various cities in Finland. The headquarters is in Helsinki.

City is aimed for the young adult population of 18- to 35-year-olds. It has many articles about young adult culture, an up-to-date list of various happenings, and a discussion page which can be contributed to via letters, e-mail or SMS.

City was founded in 1985 by the first editor-in-chief Eeropekka Rislakki and media academic Kim Weckström, as its purpose to bring to Finland "city culture" that had been mostly missing in that country before. In 1986 the initially subscription based monthly changed format to a free monthly tabloid. The new editor-in-chief Kari Kivelä developed the paper towards a more popular format with a combination fashion-, lifestyle- and entertainment listings content.

From 1986 to 2012 the magazine was available in various public places in all of Finland's larger cities, including Helsinki, Tampere, Turku and Lahti. Each city had its own localised version of the magazine.

In 2012 City ceased print publication and became an online-only magazine.

In 2013 City was relaunched as a print publication, this time as a subscription rather than publicly available for pick up. The first edition of the relaunched print magazine was sponsored by the Finnish electronics store Verkkokauppa.com.

The web site of City holds various discussion forums and an on-line dating service.
